This is a general list of composers who have written music for the musical theatre, along with their works organized by first production date.  This list primarily contains musicals, but also includes links to film adaptations.  Lyricists and their work are listed separately.

For composers whose names fall into the M-Z alphabetic range, see List of musicals by composer: M to Z.

A 
 Joseph Abella
Siddhartha (2007); music also by Jude Gitamondoc, Alfeuso Esposite
 Danny Abosch
     Unwritten Rules (2007)
     Placebo (2010)
     Fancy Nancy The Musical (2012)
     Off The Wall (2013)
     Miles & Me (2013)
     Goosebumps The Musical (2016)
 Fabrice Aboulker (b. 1959)
     Les mille et une vies d'Ali Baba (2000); music also by Alain Lanty
 Tim Acito
     Zanna, Don't! (2002)
     The Women of Brewster Place (2007)
 Cliff Adams (1923–2001)
     Liza of Lambeth (1976)
 Dianne Adams
     The Wind in the Willows (1997)
 Richard Addinsell (1904–1977)
     Alice in Wonderland (1947)
     Joyce Grenfell Requests the Pleasure... (1955)
     Living for Pleasure (1958)
 John Addison (1920–1998)
     Cranks (1955)
     The Amazons (2002)
 Gary Adler (b. 1965)
     Altar Boyz (2005); music also by Michael Patrick Walker
 Richard Adler (1921–2012)
     John Murray Anderson's Almanac (1953); music also by Jerry Ross and others
     The Pajama Game (1954); music also by Jerry Ross; also a 1975 film
     Damn Yankees (1955); music also by Jerry Ross; also a 1958 film
     Kwamina (1961)
     A Mother's Kisses (1968)
     Music Is (1976)
 Milton Ager (1893–1979)
     What's in a Name? (1920)
     Rain or Shine (1929); music also by Owen Murphy
     Murray Anderson's Almanac (1929); music also by Henry Sullivan
 Fred E. Ahlert (1892–1953)
     Paris (1928); music also by Cole Porter, Walter Kollo, Harry Warren, Louis Alter
 Harry Akst (1894–1963)
     Artists and Models of 1927 (1927); music also by Maurice Rubens
     Calling All Stars (1934)
 Michelangelo Alasá
     Born to Rumba (1991)
     Chez Garbo (1996)
 Damon Albarn (b. 1968)
     Wonder.land (2015)
 Brad Alexander (b. 1971)
     Just So Stories (2003)
     If You Give A Pig A Pancake & Other Story Books (2008)
     Click, Clack, Moo (2009)
     See Rock City & Other Destinations (2010)
     We The People: America Rocks! (2010)
     Duck For President & Other Story Books (2010)
 Gene Allan
     Billy (1969); music also by Ron Dante
 Herbert Allen
     Space Is So Startling (1962); music also by Richard Hadden, Cecil Broadhurst
 Peter Allen (1944–1992)
     Up in One (1979); music also by others
     Legs Diamond (1988)
     The Boy from Oz (1998); music also by others
 Steve Allen (1921–2000)
     Sophie (1963)
 Peter Allwood
     Pendragon (1994)
 Todd Almond
     People Like Us (2005)
 Steven M. Alper (b. 1958)
     The Gifts of the Magi (1988); music also by Randy Courts
     The Library (1996)
     The Immigrant (2000)
 Gaby Alter
     Nobody Loves You (2012)
 Louis Alter (1902–1980)
     Paris (1928); music also by Cole Porter, Walter Kollo, Harry Warren, Fred E. Ahlert
 John Altman (b. 1949)
     Kisses on a Postcard (2004); music also by Gordon Clyde
 Alfred Alvarez
     Bed, Boys and Beyond (2000)
 César Alvarez
     The Elementary Spacetime Show
     The Universe is a Small Hat
     FUTURITY
 Dan Alvy
     Identical Twins from Baltimore (1995)
 Trey Anastasio (b. 1964)
     Hands on a Hard Body (2012); music also by Amanda Green
 Mark Andersen
     Widow's Waltz (1992)
 Leroy Anderson (1908–1975)
     Goldilocks (1958)
     Stardust (1987); music also by Hoagy Carmichael, Duke Ellington, Benny Goodman
 Roger Anderson
     Chaplin (1993)
     Shine! – The Horatio Alger Musical (2001)
     Abe (2009)
 Benny Andersson (b. 1946)
     Abbacadabra (1983); music also by Björn Ulvaeus
     Chess (1984); music also by Björn Ulvaeus
     Kristina från Duvemåla (1995); music also by Björn Ulvaeus
     Mamma Mia! (1999); music also by Björn Ulvaeus; also a 2008 film
 Judy Hart Angelo
     Preppies (1983); music also by Gary Portnoy
 Barbara Anselmi
     It Shoulda Been You (2015)
 Greg Antonacci
     Dance with Me (1975)
 Danny Apolinar (1934–1995)
     Your Own Thing (1968); music also by Hal Hester
 Harry Archer (1886–1960)
     Little Jessie James (1923)
     Paradise Alley (1924); music also by Carle Carlton and A. Otvos
     My Girl (1924)
     Merry, Merry (1925)
     Twinkle, Twinkle (1926)
     Just a Minute (1928)
 Leslie Arden (b. 1957)
     The Boys Are Coming Home (2006)
     The House of Martin Guerre  (1997)
 Harold Arlen (1905–1986)
     9:15 Revue (1930); music also by others
     Earl Carroll's Vanities of 1930 (1930); music also by Jay Gorney
     You Said It (1931)
     Earl Carroll's Vanities of 1932 (1932)
     Americana (1932); music also by Jay Gorney, Herman Hupfeld, Richard Meyers
     Life Begins at 8:40 (1934)
     Hooray for What! (1937)
     Star and Garter (1942); music also by others
     Bloomer Girl (1944)
     St. Louis Woman (1946)
     House of Flowers (1954)
     Jamaica (1957)
     Saratoga (1959)
     The Harold Arlen Songbook (1967)
     The Wizard of Oz (1987)
     The Wizard of Oz (2011); music also by Andrew Lloyd Webber
 David Arnold (b. 1962)
     Made in Dagenham (2014)
 Mel Atkey (b. 1958)
     O Pioneers! (2001)
     A Little Princess (2003)
 Nat D. Ayer (1987–1952)
     The Bing Boys Are Here (1916)
     Yes, Uncle! (1917)
 Charles Aznavour (1924–2018)
     Lautrec (2000)

B 
 Burt Bacharach (1928–2023)
     Promises, Promises (1968)
     The Look of Love (2003)
 David Baker (1926–1988)
     Phoenix '55 (1955)
     Copper and Brass (1957)
     Smiling, the Boy Fell Dead (1961)
     Come Summer (1969)
 Evelyn Baker
     The Catch of the Season (1904); music also by Herbert Haines
     The Talk of the Town (1905); music also by Herbert Haines
     My Darling (1907); music also by Herbert Haines
 Thomas Baker
     The Black Crook (1866); music also by George Bickwell, Giuseppe Operti
 Jon Balcourt (b. 1985)
     The Neverending Story
     Across the Way
     Forbidden Fruit
     Idol: The Musical (2007)
 Glen Ballard (b. 1953)
     Ghost (2011); music also by Dave Stewart
 Sara Bareilles (b. 1979)
     Waitress (2015)
 Jiří Bareš
     451° Fahrenheita (1993)
     Romeo a Julie (2002)
 Jeanne Bargy (1921–1993)
     Greenwich Village, U.S.A. (1960)
     Pinocchio (1965)
 Wayne Barker (b. 1965)
     Clue: The Musical (1997); music also by Galen Blum, Vinnie Martucci
     Peter and the Starcatcher (2012)
 Gary Barlow (b. 1971)
     Never Forget (2007)
     Finding Neverland (2012); music also by Eliot Kennedy
     Calendar Girls (2015); previous title The Girls
 Billy Barnes (1927–2012)
     The Billy Barnes Revue (1959)
     The Billy Barnes People (1961)
     Billy Barnes' L.A. (1962)
     Blame It on the Movies: The Reel Music of Hollywood (1989)
     Billy Barnes Revued (1999)
 Charles Barnes
     Priorities of 1942 (1942); music also by Marjery Fielding
 Eric Lane Barnes (b. 1960)
     Fairy Tales (1995)
 Mark Baron
     Frankenstein - A New Musical (2007)
 John Barry (1933–2011)
     Passion Flower Hotel (1965)
     Lolita, My Love (1971)
     Billy (1974)
     The Little Prince and the Aviator (1981)
     Brighton Rock (2004)
 Debra Barsha
     Radiant Baby (2003)
 Lionel Bart (1930–1999)
     Fings Ain't Wot They Used T'Be (1959)
     Oliver! (1960); also a 1968 film
     Blitz! (1962)
     Maggie May (1964)
     Twang! (1965)
     La Strada (1969)
 Fred Barton (b. 1958)
     Miss Gulch Returns! – The Wicked Musical (1985)
 Neil Bartram
     The Story of My Life (2008)
     The Theory of Relativity (2014)
 William H. Batchelor
     Sinbad (1891)
 Matt Batt (b. 1949)
     The Hunting of the Snark (1991)
 Jim Bauer
     The Blue Flower (2011)
 Clark Baxtresser
     A Very Potter Senior Year (2012); music also by Darren Criss, A.J. Holmes, Pierce Siebers
 The Beach Boys
     Good Vibrations (2005); music also by Brian Wilson
 Beaker
     Canticle of the Plains (1997); music also by Rich Mullins, Mitch McVicker
 Gilbert Bécaud (1927–2001)
     Roza (1987)
 Hank Beebe (1926–2023)
     Tuscaloosa's Calling Me...But I'm Not Going (1975)
 Bee Gees (Robin Gibb, Barry Gibb, Maurice Gibb)
     Saturday Night Fever (1998); also a 1977 film
 Louie Bellson (1924–2009)
     Portofino (1958); music also by Will Irwin
 Ralph Benatzky (1884–1957)
     The White Horse Inn (1936); music also by others
 Robert Bendorff (1951–1996)
     Strike (1985) 
     Scratch the Surface (1989) 
     Adorable Me! The Totie Fields Story (1990) 
     Aka, Henry Sugar (1992) 
     Over My Dead Body (1992, 1995) 
     Totie (1993)
     Stop the Parade (1994) 
     Eleanor of Aquitaine (1995–1996) 
     Great Expectations (1995) 
 Quint Benedetti (1926–2014)
     Topsy (1984)
 Nell Benjamin
     Cam Jansen (2004); music also by Laurence O'Keefe
     Legally Blonde (2007); music also by Laurence O'Keefe
 James Stewart Bennett
     Dogs (1983)
 Mark Bennett
     The Hunchback of Notre Dame (1991)
 Robert Russell Bennett (1894–1981)
     Great to Be Alive! (1950); music also by Abraham Ellstein
 Casey Bennetto (b. 1969)
     Keating! (2005)
 Sara Bareilles
     Waitress (2015)
 Henri Berény (1871–1932)
     The Girl from Montmartre (1912); music also by Jerome Kern
 Neil Berg
     The Prince and the Pauper (1997)
     Tim and Scrooge
     The Man Who Would Be King
     Grumpy Old Men (2008)
     The 12 (2010)
 Keith Berger (b. 1952)
     Broken Toys (1982)
 Matthew Roi Berger
     Fat Camp (2009)
 Michel Berger (1947–1992)
     Starmania (1979)
     Le Légende de Jimmy (1990)
 Baldwin Bergersen (1914–2000)
     Allah Be Praised! (1944); music also by Don Walker
     Carib Song (1945)
     Small Wonder (1948); music also by Albert Selden
     The Crystal Heart (1960)
 Norman Bergman
     Strip! (1987)
 Steven Bergman
     Jack the Ripper: The Whitechapel Musical (1997)
     The Curse of the Bambino (2001)
 Sol Berkowitz (1922–2006)
     Nowhere to Go But Up! (1962)
 Irving Berlin (1888–1989)
     Ziegfeld Follies of 1910 (1910); music also by others
     Ziegfeld Follies of 1911 (1911); music also by others
     Watch Your Step (1914)
     Stop! Look! Listen! (1915)
     Ziegfeld Follies of 1916 (1916); music also by others
     The Century Girl (1916); music also by Victor Herbert
     The Cohan Revue of 1918 (1917); music also by George M. Cohan
     Yip Yip Yaphank (1918)
     The Canary (1918); music also by others
     Ziegfeld Follies of 1919 (1919); music also by others
     Ziegfeld Follies of 1920 (1920); music also by others
     Music Box Revue (1921)
     Music Box Revue (1922)
     Music Box Revue (1923)
     Music Box Revue (1924)
     The Cocoanuts (1925); also a 1929 film
     Ziegfeld Follies of 1927 (1927)
     Face the Music (1932)
     As Thousands Cheer (1933)
     Louisiana Purchase (1940)
     This Is the Army (1942); also a 1943 film
     Annie Get Your Gun (1946)
     Miss Liberty (1949)
     Call Me Madam (1950); also a 1953 film
     Mr. President (1962)
     There's No Business Like Show Business (2000)
     White Christmas (2001)
     The Tin Pan Alley Rag (2009); music also by Scott Joplin
     Top Hat (2011)
 Norman L. Berman (b. 1949)
     Strider: The Story of a Horse (1979); music also by Mark Razovsky, S. Vetkin
     First Kids (2010)
 James Bernard (1925–2001)
     Virtue in Danger (1963)
 Danny K Bernstein 
     Far From Canterbury (2015)
 Douglas Bernstein
     A Backer's Audition (1992); music also by Denis Markell
 Elmer Bernstein (1922–2004)
     How Now, Dow Jones (1967)
     Thoroughly Modern Millie (1967 film); music also by James Van Heusen
     Merlin (1983)
 Leonard Bernstein (1918–1990)
     On the Town (1944)
     Peter Pan (1950)
     Wonderful Town (1953)
     Candide (1956)
     West Side Story (1957)
     A Party with Betty Comden and Adolph Green (1958); music also by Jule Styne, André Previn, Saul Chaplin, Roger Edens
     The Race to Urga (1969)
     1600 Pennsylvania Avenue (1976)
 Rick Besoyan (1924–1970)
     Little Mary Sunshine (1959)
     The Student Gypsy (1963)
     Babes in the Wood (1964)
 Henri Betti (1917–2005)
     Folies Bergère of 1964 (1964); music also by Georges Ulmer
 Jim Betts
     Little Women
 Prince Chakrband Bhumibol (1927–2016)
     Michael Todd's Peep Show (1950)
 Nick Bicât (b. 1949)
     The Knife (1987)
 George Bickwell
     The Black Crook (1866); music also by Thomas Baker, Giuseppe Operti
 Bernie Bierman (1908–2012)
     The Farmer Weds a Widow (1998)
     We Have Something to Say (1999)
 Gene Bissell
     New Faces of 1968 (1968)
 Michael Bitterman
     Five After Eight (1979)
     Discovering Magenta (1998)
 Georges Bizet (1838–1875)
     Carmen Jones (1943); also a 1954 film
 Frank Black (1894–1968)
     The Duchess Misbehaves (1946)
 Bryan Blackburn (1928–2004)
     Come Spy with Me (1966)
 Richard Blackford (b. 1954)
     King: A Musical Testimony (1990)
 Nick Blaemire
     Glory Days (2008)
 Alan Blaikley (1940–2022)
     Mardi Gras (1976); music also by Ken Howard
 Rikki Beadle-Blair (b. 1961)
     Stonewall (2006)
 Eubie Blake (1883–1983)
     Shuffle Along (1921)
     Keep Shufflin'  (1928)
     Shuffle Along of 1933 (1932)
     Shuffle Along of 1952 (1952); music also by Joseph Meyer
     Eubie! (1978)
     Shuffle Along, or, the Making of the Musical Sensation of 1921 and All That Followed (2016); music also by Noble Sissle
 Howard Blake (b. 1938)
     Granpa (1988)
 Ralph Blane (1914–1995)
     Best Foot Forward (1941); music also by Hugh Martin; also a 1943 film
     Three Wishes for Jamie (1952)
     Meet Me in St. Louis (1989); music also by Hugh Martin; also a 1944 film
 Lawrence J. Blank (b. 1952)
     Christy (1975)
 Jean Blaute
     Suske en Wiske (1994)
 Jerry Blatt
     Tricks (1973)
 Marc Blitzstein (1905–1964)
     The Cradle Will Rock (1938)
     No for an Answer (1941)
     Regina (1949)
     Juno (1959)
 Frederic Block
     Professionally Speaking (1986); music also by Ernst Muller, Peter Winkler
 Frankie Blue
     I Kissed a Vampire (2009)
 Galen Blum
     Clue: The Musical (1997); music also by Wayne Barker, Vinnie Martucci
 Jeff Blumenkrantz (b. 1965)
     Urban Cowboy (2003); music also by Jason Robert Brown and others
 Morris Bobrow
     Are We Almost There? (2001)
     Shopping! (2006)
     Party of Two (2010)
 Jerry Bock (1928–2010)
     Mr. Wonderful (1956); music also by Larry Holofcener, George David Weiss
     The Body Beautiful (1958)
     Fiorello! (1959)
     Tenderloin (1960)
     Man in the Moon (1963)
     She Loves Me (1963)
     To Broadway with Love (1964)
     Fiddler on the Roof (1964); also a 1971 film
     Baker Street (1965); music also by Marian Grudeff, Raymond Jessel
     The Apple Tree (1966)
     The Rothschilds (1970)
     Regards to the Lindsay Years (1973)
     The Umbrellas of Cherbourg (1979)
 Paul Bogaev (b. 1953)
     Bunty Berman Presents... (2013); music also by Ayub Khan-Din
 Craig Bohmler (b. 1956)
     Gunmetal Blues (1989)
     Enter the Guardsman (1997)
 Eli Bolin
     I Sing (2001)
 Christopher Bond (b. 1945)
     Evil Dead: The Musical (2006); music also by Frank Cipolla, Melissa Morris, George Reinblatt
 Boney M.
     Daddy Cool (2006); music also by others
 Bono (b. 1960); music also by The Edge
     Spider-Man: Turn Off the Dark (2010)
 Alexander Borodin (1833–1887)
     Kismet (1953); music adapted by Robert Wright, George Forrest; also a 1955 film
 Jeff Bowen (b. 1971)
     [title of show] (2006)
     Now. Here. This. (2012)
 Paul Bowles (1910–1999)
     Liberty Jones (1941)
 Rob Bowman
     Hot Mikado (1986); music adapted from music by Arthur Sullivan
 Boy George (b. 1961)
     Taboo (2002)
 Alex Bradford (1927–1978)
     Your Arms Too Short to Box with God (1976); music also by Micki Grant
 David Braham (1838–1905)
     The Mulligan Guard Ball (1879)
     Harrigan 'n Hart (1985); music also by Max Showalter, Edward Harrigan
 Philip Braham (1881–1934)
     Tails Up! (1918)
     London Calling! (1923); music also by Noël Coward
 Caryl Brahms (1901–1982)
     Cindy-Ella or I Gotta Shoe (1962); music also by Ned Sherrin
 Oscar Brand (1920–2016)
     A Joyful Noise (1966); music also by Paul Nassau
     The Education of H*Y*M*A*N K*A*P*L*A*N (1968); music also by Paul Nassau
     How to Steal an Election (1968)
 Johnny Brandon (1925–2017)
     Cindy (1964)
     billy noname (1970)
     Ain't Doin' Nothin' But Singin' My Song (1982)
     Oh, Diahne! (1997)
 Mike Brandt
     Exchange (1970); music also by Michael Knight, Robert J. Lowery
 Lumpy Brannan
     Hear! Hear! (1955)
 Stephen Bray (b. 1956)
     The Color Purple (2005); music also by Brenda Russell, Allee Willis
 Stuart Brayson
     From Here to Eternity (2013)
 Matthew Breindel (b. 1947)
     A Hatful of Snow (1994)
 Jacques Brel (1929–1978)
     Jacques Brel Is Alive and Well and Living in Paris (1968)
     Jacques Brel: The Rage To Live (2007)
 Peter Brewis
     The Gambler (1986)
 Edie Brickell (b. 1966)
     Bright Star (2014); music also by Steve Martin
 Leslie Bricusse (1931–2021)
     Stop the World – I Want to Get Off (1961); music also by Anthony Newley
     Fool Britannia (1963)
     The Roar of the Greasepaint – The Smell of the Crowd (1965); music also by Anthony Newley
     Scrooge (1970 film)
     Willy Wonka & the Chocolate Factory (1971 film)
     The Good Old Bad Old Days (1972); music also by Anthony Newley
     The Traveling Music Show (1978)
     Goodbye, Mr. Chips (1982)
     Doctor Dolittle (1998)
     Sherlock Holmes: The Musical (1989)
 Jonathan Brielle
     Nightmare Alley (1996)
 John R. Briggs
     Play Me a Country Song (1982); music also by Harry Manfredini
     Dracula: A Rock Opera (1997); music also by Dennis West
 Jean Briquet – see Adolf Philipp (1864–1936)
 Cecil Broadhurst (1903–1981)
     Space Is So Startling (1962); music also by Richard Hadden and Herbert Allen
 Rob Broadhurst
     I'll Be Damned (2010)
 Joseph Brooks (1938–2011)
     Metropolis (1989)
     In My Life (2005)
 Mel Brooks (b. 1926)
     The Producers (2001)
     Young Frankenstein (2007)
 Dirk Brossé (b. 1960)
     Burger Ubermensch (1989)
     Sacco & Vanzetti (1996)
     Kuifje: De Zonnetempel (2001)
     The Prince of Africa (2002)
     Tintin – Le Temple du Soleil (2002)
     Rembrandt (2006); music also by Jeroen Englebert
     Daens (2008)
     14–18 (2014)
 Michele Brourman
     Heartbeats (1989); music also by Amanda McBroom, Gerald Sternbach, Tom Snow
 Al W. Brown
     The Passing Show of 1913 (1913); music also by Jean Schwartz
 Bruce Brown
     Breast Wishes (2008)
 Dave Brown
     Fearless Frank (1980)
 Jason Robert Brown (b. 1970)
     Songs for a New World (1995)
     Parade (1998)
     The Last Five Years (2001); also a 2014 film
     Urban Cowboy (2003); music also by Jeff Blumenkrantz and others
     13 (2007)
     Honeymoon in Vegas (2012)
     The Bridges of Madison County (2013)
 Lew Brown (1893–1958)
     Yokel Boy (1939); music also by Charles Tobias, Sam H. Stept
 L. Russell Brown (b. 1940)
     The Sunset Gang (1992)
 Michael Brown (1920–2014)
     Different Times (1972)
 Harvey Brown
     That Girl at the Bijou (1956)
 Nacio Herb Brown (1896–1964)
     Take a Chance (1932); music also by Richard A. Whiting, Vincent Youmans
     Singin' in the Rain (1983)
 Oscar Brown, Jr. (1926–2005)
     Buck White (1969)
 Scott Brown (b. 1976)
     Gutenberg! The Musical! (2005); music also by Anthony King
 Steve Brown (b. 1958)
     Spend Spend Spend (1998)
     I Can't Sing! The X Factor Musical (2014)
 Gloria Bruni
     The Thorn Birds (2009)
 Bob Brush
     The First (1981)
 David Bryan  (b. 1962)
     Memphis (2002)
     The Toxic Avenger (2008)
 John Bucchino
     Urban Myths (1998), never produced
     Lavender Girl (2000); produced as part of 3hree along the musicals by Laurence O'Keefe, Robert Lindsey Nassif
     A Catered Affair (2007)
 Nikolai Budaškin – Николай Будашкин (1910–1988)
     Mrazík: Pohádkový Muzikál na Ledě (1998); music also by Boris Urbánek; after the 1964 Russian film Jack Frost
 Jimmy Buffett (b. 1946)
     Don't Stop the Carnival (1997)
     Escape to Margaritaville (2017)
 Sharon Burgett
     The Secret Garden (1986)
 Irving Burgie (1924–2019)
     Ballade for Bimshire (1963)
 Johnny Burke (1908–1964)
     Donnybrook! (1961)
     Swinging on a Star (1995); music also by others
 Artie Butler
     The People in the Picture (2011); music also by Mike Stoller
 Julian Butler
      Space Family Robinson (2002); music also by Stephen Butler
 David Byrne (b. 1952)
     Here Lies Love (2013); music also by Fatboy Slim

C 
 Robert W. Cabell (b. 1955)
     Z: The Masked Musical (1998)
 Michael Calderwood
     Slasher (1988)
 Gérard Calvi (1922–2015)
     La Plume de Ma Tante (1958)
     La Grosse Valise (1965)
 John Cameron (b. 1944)
     Zorro (2008); music also by Gipsy Kings
 Norman Campbell (1924–2004)
     Anne of Green Gables (1965)
 José María Cano (b. 1959)
     Hoy No Me Puedo Levantar (2005); music also by Nacho Cano
 Nacho Cano (b. 1963)
     Hoy No Me Puedo Levantar (2005); music also by José María Cano
 Shlomo Carlebach (1925–1994)
     Soul Doctor (2010)
 Hoagy Carmichael (1899–1981)
     Walk With Music (1940)
     Stardust (1987); music also by Benny Goodman, Duke Ellington, Leroy Anderson
 Al Carmines (1936–2005)
     Home Movies (1964)
     Promenade (1965)
     Pomegranada (1966)
     Peace (1968)
     In Circles (1968)
     W.C. (1971)
     The Faggot (1973)
 Craig Carnelia (b. 1949)
     Working (1978); music also by Stephen Schwartz, Mary Rodgers, James Taylor, Micki Grant
     Is There Life after High School? (1982)
     Three Postcards (1987)
     Pictures in the Hall (1990)
     Cast of Thousands (1995)
     Notes
 Leon Carr (1910–1976)
     The Secret Life of Walter Mitty (1964)
 Brad Carroll
     Lend Me a Tenor (2007)
 Earl Carroll (1893–1948)
     So Long, Letty (1916)
     Canary Cottage (1916)
     Earl Carroll's Vanities of 1923 (1923)
     Earl Carroll's Vanities of 1924 (1924)
 Harry Carroll (1892–1962)
     The Passing Show of 1914 (1914); music also by Sigmund Romberg
     Dancing Around (1914); music also by Sigmund Romberg
     Maid in America (1915); music also by Sigmund Romberg
 Ivan Caryll (1860–1921)
     The Shop Girl (1894)
     The Girl from Paris (The Gay Parisienne) (1896)
     A Runaway Girl (1898); music also by Lionel Monckton
     The Earl and the Girl (1904)
     Our Miss Gibbs (1909); music also by Lionel Monckton
     The Pink Lady (1911)
     The Girl Behind the Gun (1918)
     Kissing Time (1919); 1920 Broadway version with music also by William Daly
 Warren Casey (1935–1988)
     Grease (1972); music also by Jim Jacobs; also a 1978 film
 Sue Casson
     The Happy Prince (1993)
 Carter Cathcart (b. 1954)
     Possessed (1990)
 Michael Cavelli
     St. Joan (1993)
 Simon Chamberlin
     Mrs Henderson Presents (2015); music also by George Fenton
 Harry Chapin (1942–1981)
     The Night That Made America Famous (1975)
     Cotton Patch Gospel (1981)
     Lies and Legends: The Musical Stories of Harry Chapin (1985)
 Saul Chaplin (1912–1997)
     Bonanza Bound (1947)
     A Party with Betty Comden and Adolph Green (1958); music also by Leonard Bernstein, Jule Styne, André Previn, Roger Edens
 Frederick Chappelle
     Pins and Needles of 1922 (1922); music also by James F. Hanley
 Philip Charig (1902–1960)
     Yes, Yes, Yvette (1927); music also by Ben Jerome
     Just Fancy (1927); music also by Joseph Meyer
     That's a Good Girl (1928); music also by Joseph Meyer
     Polly (1929); music also by Herbert Stothart
     Sweet and Low (1930); music also by others
     Stand Up and Sing (1931)
     Nikki (1931)
     Artists and Models of 1943 (1943); music also by  Dan Shapiro, Milton Pascal
     Follow the Girls (1944); music also by Dan Shapiro, Milton Pascal
     Catch a Star! (1955); music also by Sammy Fain
 Mark "Moose" Charlap (1928–1974)
     Peter Pan (1954); music also by Jule Styne
     Whoop-Up (1958)
     The Conquering Hero (1961)
     Kelly (1965)
     Clownaround (1972)
 Philippe Chatel (1948–2021)
     émilie jolie (1979)
 Gary Cherpakov
     Oh, Johnny (1982)
     Madison Avenue (1984)
 Guo Sai Cheung
     Snow.Wolf.Lake (1997); music also by Dick Lee, Iskanada Ismail, Lam Ming Yeung
 Ralph Chicorel (b. 1930)
     Great Expectations (1995)
     Anna Karenina, The Audio Musical (2003)
 Paul Chihara (b. 1938)
     Shōgun: The Musical (1990)
 Kirsten Childs (b.1952)
     The Bubbly Black Girl Sheds Her Cameleon Skin (2000)
 Richard B. Chodosh
     The Streets of New York (1963)
     Berlin Is Mine (1966)
 Frank Churchill (1901–1942)
     Snow White and the Seven Dwarfs (1979); also a 1937 film
 Frank Cipolla
     Evil Dead: The Musical (2006); music also by Christopher Bond, Melissa Morris, George Reinblatt
 Petula Clark (b. 1932)
     Someone Like You (1989)
 Stephen Clark
     Dick Whittington (1999)
 Jimmy Cliff (b. 1948)
     The Harder They Come (2006)
 John Clifton (b. 1935)
     Man with a Load of Mischief (1966)
     El Bravo! (1981)
 Philip Close
     Lament The Musical (2007)
 Gordon Clyde (1933–2008)
     Kisses on a Postcard (2004); music also by John Altman
 Riccardo Cocciante (b. 1946)
     Notre Dame de Paris  (1998)
     Le Petit Prince (2002)
     Giulietta e Romeo (2007)
 Gregg Coffin
     Cinderella (1999)
     Convenience (2002)
     Five Course Love (2004)
     rightnextto me (2007)
 George M. Cohan (1878–1942)
     The Governor's Son (1901)
     Running for Office (1903)
     Little Johnny Jones (1904)
     Forty-five Minutes from Broadway (1906)
     George Washington, Jr. (1906)
     The Honeymooners (1907)
     The Talk of New York (1907)
     Fifty Miles from Boston (1908)
     The Yankee Prince (1908)
     The American Idea (1908)
     The Man Who Owns Broadway (1909)
     The Little Millionaire (1911)
     Vera Violetta (1911); music also by Edmund Eysler, Jean Schwartz, Louis A. Hirsch
     Hello, Broadway! (1914)
     The Cohan Revue 1916 (1916)
     The Cohan Revue 1918 (1917); music also by Irving Berlin
     The Voice of McConnell (1918)
     The Royal Vagabond (1919); music also by Anselm Goetzl, William Cary Duncan
     Little Nellie Kelly (1922); also a 1940 film
     The Rise of Rosie O'Reilly (1923)
     The Merry Malones (1927)
     Billie (1928)
     George M! (1968)
     George M. Cohan Tonight! (2006)
 Douglas J. Cohen
     No Way to Treat a Lady (1987)
     The Opposite of Sex (2004)
     The Gig (2007)
 Michael Cohen (b. 1938)
     Yours, Anne (1985)
     I Am Anne Frank (1996)
 Robert S. Cohen
     Suburb (2001)
 Robert Colby (1922–1987)
     Half-past Wednesday (1962)
 Cy Coleman (1929–2004)
     Wildcat (1960)
     Little Me (1962)
     Sweet Charity (1966)
     Seesaw (1973)
     I Love My Wife (1977)
     On the Twentieth Century (1978)
     Barnum (1980)
     Welcome to the Club (1989)
     City of Angels (1989)
     The Life (1990)
     The Will Rogers Follies (1991)
     Exactly Like You (1999)
     Ostrovsky (2004)
     Pamela's First Musical (2008)
     The Best Is Yet to Come: The Music of Cy Coleman (2011)
 Phil Collins (b. 1951)
     Tarzan (2006); also a 1999 animated film
 Robert Collister
     Captive (1998)
 Harry Connick, Jr. (b. 1967)
     Thou Shalt Not (2001)
 Kevin Connors
     Prime Time Prophet (1993)
 Con Conrad (1891–1938)
     Betty Lee (1924); music also by Louis A. Hirsch
     Kitty's Kisses (1926)
 Roger Cook (b. 1940)
     Beautiful and Damned (2004); music also by Les Reed
 Will Marion Cook (1869–1944)
     The Casino Girl (1900)
     Uncle Eph's Christmas (1901)
     In Dahomey (1903)
     The Southerners (1904)
     Abyssinia (1906)
     Bandanna Land (1908)
 J. Fred Coots (1897–1985)
     Sally, Irene and Mary (1922)
     Artists and Models of 1924 (1924); music also by Sigmund Romberg
     Artists and Models of 1925 (1925); music also by Alfred Goodman, Maurice Rubens
     June Days (1925)
     Gay Paree (1925)
     The Merry World (1926)
     A Night in Paris (1926); music also by Maurie Rubens
     White Lights (1927)
     Sons o' Guns (1929)
 Adam Cork
     London Road (2011)
 Martin Coslett
     The Perfect City (2013)
 C. C. Courtney
     Salvation (1969); music also by Peter Link
 Randy Courts
     The Gifts of the Magi (1988); music also by Steven M. Alper
 Noël Coward (1899–1973)
     The Light Blues (1916); music also by others
     London Calling! (1923); music also by Philip Braham
     On with the Dance (1925); music also by others
     This Year of Grace (1928)
     Bitter Sweet (1929)
     Cavalcade (1931); music also by others
     Words and Music (1932)
     Conversation Piece (1934)
     Tonight at 8.30 (1936)
     Operette (1938)
     Set to Music (1939)
     Sigh No More (1945)
     Pacific 1860 (1946)
     Ace of Clubs (1950)
     After the Ball (1954)
     Sail Away (1961)
     The Girl Who Came to Supper (1963)
     Noël Coward's Sweet Potato (1968)
     Oh, Coward! (1972)
     Cowardy Custard (1972)
     Noël and Gertie (1986)
     A Talent to Amuse (1994)
     Let's Do It! (1994); music also by Cole Porter
     If Love Were All (1998)
 Paul Crabtree
     Tennessee, USA! (1965)
 Larry Crane
     We'd Rather Switch (1969)
 Lor Crane
     Whispers on the Wind (1970)
 Mike Craver
     Oil City Symphony (1986); music also by Mark Hardwick, Debra Monk, Mary Murfitt
     Radio Gals (1995); music also by Mark Hardwick
 Greg Crease
     Someone's Son (1999)
 Luigi Creatore (1920–2015)
     Maggie Flynn (1968); music also by Hugo Peretti, George David Weiss
 Darren Criss (b. 1987)
     A Very Potter Musical (2009); music also by A.J. Holmes
     Me and My Dick (2009); music also by A.J. Holmes, Carlos Valdes
     A Very Potter Sequel (2010)
     Starship (2011)
     A Very Potter Senior Year (2012); music also by Clark Baxtresser, A.J. Holmes, Pierce Siebers
 Rick Crom (b. 1957)
     Space Trek (1997)
     Newsical, the Musical (2004)
 Jonathan Croose
     Saucy Jack and the Space Vixens (1998); music also by Robin Forrest, Adam Meggido
 Anthony Crowley
     Tribe (2004)
 Jim Crozier
     Touch (1970); music also by Kenn Long
 Raphael Crystal
     Kuni-Leml (1984)
 Philip Culkin
     Marjorie (1924); music also by Sigmund Romberg, Herbert Stothart, Stephen Jones
 Christopher Curtis
     Chaplin (2010); also known as Limelight: The Story of Charlie Chaplin
 Gene Curty
     The Lieutenant (1975); music also by Nitra Scharfman, Chuck Strand
 Charles Cuvillier (1877–1955)
     Flora Bella (1916); music also by Milton Schwartzwald
     Afgar (1919)

D 
 Robert Dahdah
     Curley McDimple (1967)
 William Daly (1887–1936)
     Everything (1918); music also by others
     Kissing Time (1919); music also by Ivan Caryll; Daly contributed one song to the 1920 Broadway production
     For Goodness Sake (1922); music also by Paul Lannin
     Our Nell (1923); music also by George Gershwin
     Jack and Jill (1923); music also by others
 Barbara Damashek
     Quilters (1984)
 Jeff Daniels
     Time (1986); music also by David Pomeranz
 Stan Daniels (1934–2007)
     So Long, 174th Street (1976)
     Enter Laughing (2008)
 Harold Danko (b. 1947)
     A Matter of Opinion (1980); music also by John Jacobson
 John Dankworth (1927–2010)
     Colette (1980)
 Roberto Danova (b. 1937)
     The Phantom of the Opera on Ice (1995)
 Michael Dansicker
     Twenty Fingers, Twenty Toes (1989)
 Ron Dante (b. 1945)
     Billy (1969); music also by Gene Allan
 August Darnell (b. 1950)
     In a Pig's Valise (1989)
 Herbert Darnley (1872–1947)
     Mr. Wix of Wickham (1902); music also by George Everard; 1904 Broadway version with additional songs by Jerome Kern
 Arthur Darvill (b. 1982)
     Been So Long (2009)
     Fantastic Mr Fox (2016)
 Shaun Davey (b. 1948)
     James Joyce's The Dead (1999)
 Michal David (b. 1960)
     Kleopatra (2002)
     Tři mušketýři (2004)
 Victor Davies (b. 1939)
     Beowulf (1974)
 Benny Davis (1985–1979)
     Take a Bow (1944); music also by Ted Murray
 Buster Davis (1918–1987)
     Doctor Jazz (1975); music also by Luther Henderson
 Carl Davis
     The Vackees
 Kingsley Day
     Summer Stock Murder
 Reginald de Koven (1859–1920)
     The Begum (1887)
     Don Quixote (1889)
     Robin Hood (1890)
     The Knickerbockers (1892)
     The Algerian (1893)
     The Fencing Master (1893)
     Rob Roy (1894)
     The Tzigane (1895)
     The Mandarin (1896)
     The Highwayman (1897)
     The Man in the Moon (1899); music also by Ludwig Engländer, Gustav Kerker
     The Three Dragoons (1899)
     Papa's Wife (1899)
     Foxy Quiller (1900)
     The Little Duchess (1901)
     Maid Marian (1902); 2nd version of Robin Hood
     The Jersey Lily (1903)
     The Red Feather (1903)
     Happyland (1905)
     The Student King (1906)
     The Girls of Holland (1907)
     The Golden Butterfly (1908)
     The Beauty Spot (1909)
     The Wedding Trip (1911)
     Her Little Highness (1913)
Stephen DeCesare
     Santa Claus and the Christ Child (1994)
     The Competition (1995)
     Rage of Love (1995)
     My Daddy Jesus (1996)
     Jesus Is The Reason For The Season (1996)
     The Easter Pageant That Almost Wasn't (1997)
     Fourth Wise Man (1997)
     Our Lady Of Fatima (1998)
     Bearskin (2001)
     Everyman (2001)
     Why The Chimes Rang (2001)
     Alpha and Omega: Maranatha (2001)
     Christmas Every Day (2002)
     Prodigal Son (2002)
     Little Red Riding Hood (2003)
     A Christmas Carol (2003)
     Juggler Of Notre Dame (2003)
     Princess Aleia (2003)
     Noel Candle (2004)
     Kolbe (2004)
     Picture of Dorian Gray (2005)
     Feo (The Ugly Duckling) (2006)
     Passion (2007)
     What Would Jesus Do? (2008)
     Bible Rock (2008)
     The Selfish Giant (2009)
     Faustina (2010)
     Jungle Book (2011)
     The Gift Of The Magi (2011)
     Peter Rabbit (2012)
 Jackie Dempsey
     Squonk: Bigsmörgåsbørdwünderwerk (1999)
 Robert Dennis (member of The Open Window)
     Oh! Calcutta! (1969); music also by Peter Schickele, Stanley Walden
 Gene de Paul (1919–1988)
     Li'l Abner (1956); also a 1959 film
     Seven Brides for Seven Brothers (1982); music also by Al Kasha, Joel Hirschhorn; also a 1954 film
 Joel Derfner (b. 1973)
     Blood Drive (2003)
     Signs of Life (2009)    
 Peter DeRose (1900–1953)
     Earl Carroll's Vanities of 1940 (1940); music also by Charles Rosoff
 Frédérick Desroches
     Second Chance (2009)
 Dennis DeYoung (b. 1947)
     The Hunchback of Notre Dame (1996)
     The 101 Dalmatians (2009)
 Robert Emmett Dolan (1908–1972)
     Texas, Li'l Darlin'  (1949)
     Not for Children (1951)
     Foxy (1964)
 Stephen Dolginoff
     One Foot Out the Door (1993)
     Most Men Are (1995)
     Journey to the Center of the Earth (1999)
     Thrill Me: The Leopold & Loeb Story (2003)
     Panic (2009)
 Walter Donaldson (1893–1947)
     Sweetheart Time (1926); music also by Joseph Meyer
     Whoopee! (1928); also a 1930 film
 Steve Dorff (b. 1949)
     Lunch (1994)
 Ian Dorricott (b. 1949)
     Man of Steel (1978)
     Bats (1983)
 Jill Dowse
     Thatcher The Musical (2006)
 Stephen Downs
     Festival (1979)
 James P. Doyle
     The Wonderful Wizard of Oz (2000)
 Ervin Drake (1919–2015)
     What Makes Sammy Run? (1964)
     Her First Roman (1968)
 John Driver
     Ride the Winds (1974)
     Scrambled Feet (1979); music also by Jeffery Haddow
 Matt Dubey
     Smith (1973); music also by Dean Fuller
 Andy Duerden
     Bliss (2000)
 Gordon Duffy
     Happy Town (1959)
 Vernon Duke (1893–1969)
     The Garrick Gaieties (1930)
     Walk a Little Faster (1932)
     Ziegfeld Follies of 1934 (1934); music also by others
     Ziegfeld Follies of 1936 (1936)
     The Show Is On (1936); music also by others
     Cabin in the Sky (1940); also a 1943 film
     Banjo Eyes (1941)
     The Lady Comes Across (1942)
     Jackpot (1944)
     Sadie Thompson (1944)
     Sweet Bye and Bye (1946)
     Two's Company (1952)
     The Littlest Revue (1956)
     Zenda (1963)
     Nashville, New York (1979); music also by Kurt Weill
 William Cary Duncan
     The Royal Vagabond (1919); music also by George M. Cohan, Anselm Goetzl
 John Du Prez (b. 1946)
     Spamalot (2005); music also by Eric Idle
 Ann Duquesnay
     Bring in 'Da Noise, Bring in 'Da Funk (1995); music also by Daryl Waters and Zane Mark
 Bob Dylan (b. 1941)
     The Times They Are a-Changin' (2006)
 Antonín Dvořák (1841–1904)
     Summer Song (1956)
     Rusalka (1998); musical by Zdeněk John after Dvořák's opera Rusalka
 Richard A. Dworsky
     The Marvelous Land of Oz (1981)

E 
 Leslie Eberhard
     Hey Ma...Kaye Ballard (1984); music also by David Levy
 Roger Edens (1905–1970)
     A Party with Betty Comden and Adolph Green (1958); music also by Leonard Bernstein, Jule Styne, André Previn, Saul Chaplin
 The Edge (b. 1961); music also by Bono
     Spider-Man: Turn Off the Dark (2010)
 Anderson Edwards
     Thunder Knocking at the Door (2002); music also by Keb' Mo'
 Leo Edwards (1886–1978)
     The Passing Show of 1915 (1915); music also by J. Leubrie Hill, William Frederick Peters
     You'll See Stars (1942)
 Sherman Edwards (1919–1981)
     1776 (1969)
 Stephen Edwards
     Tess of the d'Urbervilles (1999)
     Moon Landing (2007)
 Michael Edwin
     Shabbatai (1995); music also by Michael Shubert
 Bertha Egnos (1913–2003)
     Ipi-Tombi (1974)
 Danny Elfman (b. 1953)
     Edward Scissorhands (2006); music also by Terry Davies
 Ron Eliran (b. 1944)
     Don't Step on My Olive Branch (1976)
     Nightsong (1977)
 Peter Elkstrom
     Doctor Doctor (1997)
 John Eller
     Adonis (1884); music also by Edward E. Rice
 Duke Ellington (1899–1974)
     Beggar's Holiday (1946)
     My People (1963)
     Pousse-Café (1966)
     Sophisticated Ladies (1981); music also by others
     Stardust (1987); music also by Hoagy Carmichael, Benny Goodman, Leroy Anderson
     A Drum Is a Woman (1996)
     Play On! (1997)
 Justin Ellington
     The Seven (2006); music by Will Power, Will Hammond
 Don Elliott (1926–1984)
     A Thurber Carnival (1960)
     The Beast in Me (1963)
 Vivian Ellis (1904–1996)
     Mr. Cinders (1929); music also by Richard Myers
     Bless the Bride (1947)
     The Water Gipsies (1954)
     Listen to the Wind (1955)
 Abraham Ellstein (1907–1963)
     Great to Be Alive! (1950); music also by Robert Russell Bennett
     Yiddle with a Fiddle (1997); also a 1936 film: Yidl Mitn Fidl
 Ludwig Engländer (1851–1914)
     The Man in the Moon (1899); music also by Gustav Kerker, Reginald Dekoven
 Jeroen Englebert
     Rembrandt (2006); music also by Dirk Brossé
 Jon English (1949–2016)
     Paris (2003)
 Joe Ercole (b. 1951)
     Ka-Boom! (1980)
 Alfeuso Esposite
Siddhartha (2007); music also by Jude Gitamondoc, Joseph Abella
 David Essex (b. 1947)
     Mutiny (1985)
 Albert Evans
     Pageant (1991)
 David Evans
     Birds of Paradise (1987)
     Children's Letters to God (2004)
 Ray Evans (1915–2007)
     Aaron Slick from Punkin Crick (1952); music also by Jay Livingston
     Oh, Captain! (1958); music also by Jay Livingston
     Let It Ride (1961); music also by Jay Livingston
 George Everard
     Mr. Wix of Wickham (1902); music also by Herbert Darnley; 1904 Broadway version with additional songs by Jerome Kern
 Edmund Eysler (1874–1949)
     Vera Violetta (1911); music also by George M. Cohan, Jean Schwartz, Louis A. Hirsch
     The Laughing Husband (1914); music also by Jerome Kern, Wimperis
     The Blue Paradise (1915); music also by Sigmund Romberg

F 
 Daniel Facerias
     Le Bal des Exclus
 Scott Fagan
     Soon (1971); music also by Joseph M. Kookolis
 Sammy Fain (1902–1989)
     Everybody's Welcome (1931)
     Hellzapoppin' (1938); music also by Charles Tobias
     George White's Scandals of 1939 (1939)
     Boys and Girls Together (1940)
     Sons o' Fun (1941)
     Toplitzky of Notre Dame (1946)
     Alive and Kicking (1950); music also by others
     Flahooley (1951)
     Ankles Aweigh (1955)
     Catch a Star (1955); music also by Philip Charig
     Christine (1960)
     Something More! (1964)
     Calamity Jane (1995); also a 1953 film
 Beth Falcone
     Wanda's World (2008)
 Leo Fall (1873–1925)
     The Siren (1911)
     The Doll Girl (1913); additional music by Jerome Kern
     The Rose of Stamboul (1922); music also by Sigmund Romberg
 John Farrar (b. 1946)
     Heathcliff (1996)
     Xanadu (2007); music also by Jeff Lynne
 Fatboy Slim (b. 1963)
     Here Lies Love (2013); music also by David Byrne
 Mary Feinsinger
     Hot Klezmer (1998); music also by Harold Seletsky
 Jed Feuer
     Eating Raoul (1992)
 George Fenton (b. 1949)
     Mrs Henderson Presents (2015); music also by Simon Chamberlin
 Addy O. Fieger
     Dear Oscar (1972)
 John Field (b. 1962)
     Evie and the Birdman
 Marjery Fielding
     Priorities of 1942 (1942); music also by Charles Barnes
 Amina Figarova (b. 1964)
     Diana: de Musical (2000)
 Elliot Finkel
     Finkel's Follies (1991)
 William Finn (b. 1952)
     In Trousers (1979)
     March of the Falsettos (1981)
     America Kicks Up Its Heels (1983)
     Romance in Hard Times (1989)
     Falsettoland (1990)
     Falsettos (1992)
     A New Brain (1998)
     Infinite Joy (2001)
     Elegies: A Song Cycle (2003)
     The 25th Annual Putnam County Spelling Bee (2005)
     Make Me a Song (2007)
     Little Miss Sunshine (2011)
 George Fischoff (1938–2018)
     The Prince and the Pauper (1963)
     Georgy (1970)
     Shephard (1993)
 Stephen Flaherty (b. 1960)
     Pitts (1976)
     Lucky Stiff (1988)
     Once on This Island (1990)
     My Favorite Year (1992)
     Proposals (1997) (incidental music only)
     Ragtime (1996)
     Seussical (2000)
     A Man of No Importance (2002)
     A Long Gay Book (2003); an early version of Loving Repeating
     Dessa Rose (2005)
     Loving Repeating (2005)
     Chita Rivera: The Dancer's Life (2005); music also by others
     The Glorious Ones (2007)
     Rocky (2012)
     Little Dancer (2014)
     Anastasia (2016)
 Lewis Flinn
     Lysistrata Jones (2011)
 John Foley (b. 1949)
     Pump Boys and Dinettes (1981); music also by others
 James-Allen Ford
     The Tell Tale Heart and Other Classics (Condensed Classics) (2003)
     Martha! The Unauthorized Musical (2005)
     If You Give A Mouse A Cookie and Other Storybooks (2006)
     In Transit (2016)
 Nancy Ford (b. 1935)
     Now Is the Time for All Good Men (1967)
     The Last Sweet Days of Isaac (1970)
     Shelter (1973)
     I'm Getting My Act Together and Taking It on the Road (1978)
     The American Girls Revue (1998)
     Anne of Green Gables (2007)
 George Forrest (1915–1999)
     Song of Norway (1944); music also by Robert Wright, adapted from themes of Edvard Grieg; also a 1970 film
     Gypsy Lady (1946); music also by Robert Wright, adapted from themes of Victor Herbert
     Magdalena (1948); music also by Robert Wright, adapted from themes of Heitor Villa-Lobos
     Kismet (1953); music also by Robert Wright, adapted from themes of Alexander Borodin; also a 1955 film
     The Love Doctor (1959); music also by Robert Wright
     Kean (1961); music also by Robert Wright
     Anya, "Anastasia" (1965); music also by Robert Wright, adapted from themes of Sergei Rachmaninov
     The Great Waltz (1930); music also by Robert Wright, adapted from Johann Strauss II
     Timbuktu! (1978); music also by Robert Wright
     Grand Hotel (1989); music also by Robert Wright, Maury Yeston
     Anastasia (revision of Anya) (1991); music also by Robert Wright, adapted from themes of Sergei Rachmaninov
 Robert Forrest
     Paradise! (1985)
 Robin Forrest
     Saucy Jack and the Space Vixens (1998); music also by Jonathan Croose, Adam Meggido
 John Forster
     How to Eat Like a Child (1981)
 Royal Foster
     Blackouts of 1949 (1949); music also by Charles Henderson
 Stephen Foster (1826–1864)
     The Stephen Foster Story, (Stephen Foster – The Musical) (1959)
 Raymond Fox
     Take It Easy (1996)
 Steve Fox
     The Gift (2000)
 Erik Frandsen
     Song of Singapore (1991); music also by Michael Garin, Robert Hipkins, Paula Lockheart
 Larry Frank
     Frank Merriwell: Honor Challenged (1971); music also by Skip Redwine
 Mathew Frank
     Prodigal (2000)
 Scott Frankel (b. 1963)
     Grey Gardens (2006)
     Happiness (2009)
     Far from Heaven (2013)
     War Paint (2016)
 Mat Fraser (b. 1962)
     Thalidomide!! A Musical (2005)
 Harold Fraser-Simson (1872–1944)
     The Maid of the Mountains (1916)
 Grenoldo Frazier
     Moms (1987)
 Cassius Freeborn
     Mam'zelle Champagne (1906)
 Stan Freeman (1920–2001)
     I Had a Ball (1964); music also by Jack Lawrence
     Lovely Ladies, Kind Gentlemen (1970); music also by Franklin Underwood
 Dorothea Freitag (1914–2001)
     Mask and Gown (1957); music also by Ronny Graham, Arthur Siegel
 Rob Fremont
     Piano Bar (1978)
 Frederick Freyer
     Captains Courageous: The Musical (1999)
 David Friedman (b. 1950)
     Chasing Nicolette
     Scandalous: The Life and Trials of Aimee Semple McPherson (2005); also known as Saving Aimee; music also by David Pomeranz
     Stunt Girl (2009)
 Gary William Friedman
     The Me Nobody Knows (1970)
     Platinum (1978)
     Taking My Turn (1983)
     Sunset (1978)
     Bring in the Morning (1994)
     The Last Supper: A Musical Enactment (1995)
     Sheba (1996)
     Magpie (2007)
     Treasure Island (2012)
 Michael Friedman (1975–2017)
     Gone Missing (2003)
     Saved (2008)
     This Beautiful City (2008)
     Bloody Bloody Andrew Jackson (2009)
     Love's Labour's Lost (2013)
 Cliff Friend (1893–1974)
     Piggy (1927)
     George White's Scandals of 1929 (1929); music also by George White, Ray Henderson
 Rudolf Friml (1879–1972)
     The Firefly (1912)
     High Jinks (1913)
     The Peasant Girl (1915)
     Katinka (1915)
     You're in Love (1917)
     Kitty Darlin''' (1917)
     Sometime (1918)
     Gloriana (1918)
     Tumble In (1919)
     The Little Whopper (1919)
     June Love (1921)
     Ziegfeld Follies of 1921 (1921); music also by Victor Herbert and others
     The Blue Kitten (1922)
     Cinders (1923)
     Rose-Marie (1924); music also by Herbert Stothart
     The Vagabond King (1925)
     No Foolin'  (1926); title changed during run to Ziegfeld's American Revue of 1926     The Wild Rose (1926)
     The White Eagle (1927)
     The Three Musketeers (1928)
     Luana (1930)
     Music Hath Charms (1934)
 Al Frisch (1916–1976)
     Bordello (1974)
 Dave Frishberg (b. 1933)
     Secrets Every Smart Traveler Should Know (1997); music also by Murray Grand
 Dean Fuller
     Smith (1973); music also by Matt Dubey
 Rachel Fuller (b. 1973)
     The Boy Who Heard Music (2007); music also by Pete Townshend
 Seymour Furth (1876–1932)
     The Mimic World 1908 (1908); music also by Ben Jerome
     Bringing Up Father (1925)

 G 
 Nick Gage
     Holy Musical B@man! (2012); music also by Scott Lamps
 Dick Gallagher (1955–2005)
     Have I Got a Girl for You (1986)
     Whoop-Dee-Doo! (1993); additional music by others
     When Pigs Fly!! (1996)
 Kim Hee Gap
     The Last Empress (1995)
 Rob Gardner
     Blackbeard (2008)
 Brian Gari
     Late Nite Comic (1987)
     A Hard Time to Be Single (1990)
     Love Online (1997)
 Janet Gari
     Such a Pretty Face (1994)
 Michael Garin
     Song of Singapore (1991); music also by Erik Frandsen, Robert Hipkins, Paula Lockheart
 Enrico Garzilli (b. 1937)
     Rage of the Heart (1987)
 Clarence Gaskill (1892–1947)
     Earl Carroll's Vanities of 1925 (1925)
 Bob Gaudio (b. 1942)
     Peggy Sue Got Married (2001)
     Jersey Boys (2005)
 Percy Gaunt (1852–1896)
     A Trip to Chinatown (1891)
 Noel Gay (1898–1954)
     Me and My Girl (1937)
     Radio Times (1992)
 Charles Gaynor (1909–1975)
     Lend an Ear (1948)
     Show Girl (1961)
     Irene (1973); music mostly by Harry Tierney
 Stanley J. Gelber
     Love and Let Love (1968)
 Gary Geld (b. 1935)
     Purlie (1970)
     Shenandoah (1974)
     Angel (1978)
 Lewis E. Gensler (1896–1978)
     Queen o' Hearts (1922); music also by Dudley Wilkinson
     Be Yourself! (1924); music also by Milton Schwartzwald
     Captain Jinks (1925); music also by Stephen Jones
     Queen High (1926); also a 1930 film
     Ups-a Daisy (1928)
     The Gang's All Here (1931)
     Ballyhoo of 1932 (1932)
 Robert Gerlach (b. 1938)
     Something's Afoot (1976); music also by James McDonald, David Vos
 Andrew Gerle
     Meet John Doe (2007)
 Arthur Gershwin (1900–1981)
     A Lady Says Yes (1945); music also by Fred Spielman
 George Gershwin (1898–1937)
     Sinbad (1918); music mostly by Sigmund Romberg and others
     La-la Lucille (1919)
     George White's Scandals of 1920 (1920)
     George White's Scandals of 1921 (1921)
     A Dangerous Maid (1921)
     George White's Scandals of 1922 (1922)
     Our Nell (1922); music also by William Daly
     George White's Scandals of 1923 (1923)
     Sweet Little Devil (1924)
     George White's Scandals of 1924 (1924)
     Lady, Be Good! (1924)
     Primrose (1924)
     Tell Me More! (1925)
     Tip-Toes (1925)
     Song of the Flame (1925); music also by Herbert Stothart; also a 1930 film
     Oh, Kay! (1926)
     Funny Face (1927)
     Rosalie (1928); music also by Sigmund Romberg
     Treasure Girl (1928)
     Show Girl (1929)
     Strike up the Band (1930)
     Girl Crazy (1930)
     Of Thee I Sing (1931)
     Pardon My English (1933)
     Let 'Em Eat Cake (1933)
     Porgy and Bess (1935)
     My One and Only (1983)
     Crazy for You (1992)
     The Gershwins' Fascinating Rhythm (1999)
     American Rhapsody: A New Musical Revue (2000)
     Nice Work If You Can Get It (2008)
     An American in Paris (2014)
 Rosalie Gerut
     Songs of Paradise (1989)
 Clark Gesner (1938–2002)
     You're a Good Man, Charlie Brown (1967)
     The Utter Glory of Morrissey Hall (1979)
     Animal Fair (1990)
     The Jello Is Always Red (1998)
     The Bloomers (2000)
 Barry Gibb (b. 1946)
     Saturday Night Fever (1998); music also by Maurice Gibb, Robin Gibb; also a 1977 film
 Maurice Gibb (1949–2003)
     Saturday Night Fever (1998); music also by Barry Gibb, Robin Gibb; also a 1977 film
 Robin Gibb (1949–2012)
     Saturday Night Fever (1998); music also by Barry Gibb, Maurice Gibb; also a 1977 film
 Melville Gideon (1884–1933)
     Nuts and Wine (1914); music also by Frank E. Tours
     The Co-Optimists (1921); music also by others
     The Optimists (1928); music also by others
 James Gilbert
     Grab Me a Gondola (1956)
 Yves Gilbert
     Napoléon (1984)
 Jon Giluntin
     Hit the Lights! (1993); additional music by Chris Hajian
 Gipsy Kings
     Zorro (2008); music also by John Cameron
Jude Gitamondoc
     Siddhartha (2007); music also by Joseph Abella, Alfeuso Esposite
 Philip Glassborow
     The Great Big Radio Show! (1993)
 Ben Glasstone
     The Mouse Queen (2006)
 Anselm Goetzl (1878–1923)
     The Royal Vagabond (1919); music also by George M. Cohan, William Cary Duncan
 Dan Goggin (b. 1943)
     Hark! (1972)
     A One-Way Ticket To Broadway (1979)
     Nunsense (1985)
     Balancing Act (1992)
     Nunsense II: The Second Coming (1992)
     Nunsense 2: The Sequel (1994)
     Nunsense 3: The Jamboree (1995)
     Nuncrackers: The Nunsense Christmas Musical (1998)
     Nunsense A-Men! (1998)
     Meshuggah-Nuns! (2004)
     Nunsensations!: The Nunsense Vegas Revue (2005)
 Don Gohman
     Ambassador (1971)
 Ernest Gold (1921–1999)
     I'm Solomon (1968)
 Ernie Golden (1890–1972)
     Artists and Models of 1930 (1930); music also by Harold Stern
 Billy Goldenberg (1936–2020)
     Ballroom (1978)
 Elliot Goldenthal (b. 1954)
     Juan Darién: A Carnival Mass (1988)
     The Green Bird (1996)
 Robert Goldman (b. 1932)
     First Impressions (1959); music also by Glenn Paxton, George David Weiss
 Zina Goldrich (b. 1964)
     Dear Edwina (2002)
     Junie B. Jones (2004)
 Peter Golub
     Amphigorey: A Musicale (1994)
 Howard Goodall (b. 1958)
     The Hired Man (1984)
     Girlfriends (1986)
     Days of Hope (1991)
     Silas Marner (1993)
     The Kissing-Dance (1999)
     The Dreaming (2001)
     The Winter's Tale (2005)
     Two Cities (2006)
     Love Story (2010)
 Alfred Goodman (1890–1972)
     Artists and Models of 1925 (1925); music also by J. Fred Coots, Maurice Rubens, Sigmund Romberg
 Benny Goodman (1909–1986)
     Stardust (1987); music also by Hoagy Carmichael, Duke Ellington, Leroy Anderson
 Bob Goodman
     Wild and Wonderful: A Big City Fable (1971)
 Paul Scott Goodman
     Bright Lights, Big City (1999)
     Rooms: A Rock Romance (2009)
 Carlos Gorbea
     Charge It, Please (1991)
 Paul Gordon (b. 1975)
     Greetings from Venice Beach (1993)
     Jane Eyre (1995)
     Emma (2006)
     Daddy Long Legs (2009)
     Sense and Sensibility (2015)
     The Front, music also by Jay Gruska
 Ricky Ian Gordon (b. 1956)
     Dream True: My Life with Vernon Dixon (1999)
     My Life with Albertine (2003)
     Orpheus and Euridice (2006)
 Michael Gore (b. 1951)
     Carrie (1988)
 Jay Gorney (1894–1990)
     Merry-Go-Round (1927); music also by Henry Souvaine
     Earl Carroll's Sketch Book of 1929 (1929)
     Earl Carroll's Vanities of 1930 (1930); music also by Harold Arlen
     Americana (1932); music also by Harold Arlen, Herman Hupfeld, Richard Meyers
     New Americana (1932); music also by others
     Heaven on Earth (1946)
     Touch and Go (1949)
 Jack Gottlieb (b. 1930)
     Monkey Biz'nis (1992)
     After the Flood (1990–91, revised 1995)
 Kath Gotts
     Bad Girls (2006)
 John Gould
     Betjemania (1976)
 Matt Gould
     Witness Uganda (2014); music also by Griffin Matthews
 Morton Gould (1913–1996)
     Enter Juliet     Something to Do     Billion Dollar Baby (1945)
     Concert Varieties: Interplay (1945)
     Arms and the Girl (1950)
 Patrick Gowers (1936–2014)
     Share My Lettuce (1957); music also by Keith Statham
 Irvin Graham (1909–2001)
     Crazy with the Heat (1941); music also by Rudi Revil, Dana Suesse
 Ronny Graham (1919–1999)
     Mask and Gown (1957); music also by Dorothea Freitag, Arthur Siegel
 Ron Grainer (1922–1981)
     Robert and Elizabeth (1964)
     On the Level (1966)
 Murray Grand (1919–2007)
     Secrets Every Smart Traveler Should Know (1997); music also by Dave Frishberg
 Micki Grant (b. 1929)
     Don't Bother Me, I Can't Cope (1971)
     Your Arms Too Short to Box with God (1976); music also by Alex Bradford
     Working (1978); music also by Stephen Schwartz, Mary Rodgers, James Taylor, Craig Carnelia
     It's So Nice to Be Civilized (1980)
 John MacLachlan Gray (b. 1946)
     Billy Bishop Goes to War (1978); music also by Eric Peterson
 Timothy Gray (1926–2007)
     High Spirits (1964); music also by Hugh Martin
 Amanda Green (b. 1965)
     Hands on a Hard Body (2012); music also by Trey Anastasio
 John W. "Johnny" Green (1908–1989)
     Murder at the Vanities (1933); also a 1934 film
     Mr. Whittington (1933)
     Beat the Band (1942)
 Green Day
     American Idiot (2009)
 Stephen Greenhorn (b. 1964)
     Sunshine on Leith (2007)
 Rebecca Greenstein
     Plan B (2008)
 Peter Greenwell (1929–2006)
     The Crooked Mile (1959)
     The Mitford Girls (1981)
 Ellie Greenwich (1940–2009)
     Leader of the Pack (1984)
 Jesse Greer (1896–1970)
     Shady Lady (1933); music also by Sam H. Stept
 John Gregor
     Pinkalicious (2007)
 María Grever (1884–1951)
     Viva O'Brien (1941)
 Edvard Grieg (1843–1907)
     Song of Norway (1944); music adapted by Robert Wright, George Forrest; also a 1970 film
 Patty Griffin (b. 1964)
     10 Million Miles (2007)
 Larry Grossman (b. 1938)
     Minnie's Boys (1970)
     Goodtime Charley (1975)
     Snoopy!! (1975); also a 1988 TV Special
     A Doll's Life (1982)
     Ann Reinking...Music Loves Me (1984)
     Grind (1985)
     The Gay Century Songbook (2000)
     It Must Be Him (2010)
 Marian Grudeff (1927–2006)
     Baker Street (1965); music also by Jerry Bock, Raymond Jessel
 Frank Grullon
     I Don <3 U Ne Mor (2010); music also by Cathy Thomas
 Bernard Grun (1901–1972)
     Balalaika (1936); music also by George Posford
 Bill Grundy (1923–1993)
     This Was Burlesque (1965); music also by Sonny Lester
 Robert Grusecki
     Greetings from Yorkville (2007)
 Jay Gruska
     The Front, music also by Paul Gordon
 John Guare (b. 1938)
     Rich and Famous (1976)
 Christopher Guest (b. 1948)
     National Lampoon's Lemmings (1973); music also by Paul Jacobs
 Adam Guettel (b. 1964)
     Floyd Collins (1994)
     Saturn Returns (1998); also known as Myths and Hymns     The Light in the Piazza (2003)
 Adam Gwon (b. 1979)
     Bernice Bobs Her Hair (2008)
     Ordinary Days (2008)
     The Boy Detective Fails (2009)
     Cloudlands (2011)
     Cake Off (2015)
     String (2018)
     Scotland, PA (2019)

 H 
 Richard Hadden
     Space Is So Startling (1962); music also by Herbert Allen and Cecil Broadhurst
 Jeffery Haddow (b. 1947)
     Scrambled Feet (1979); music also by John Driver
 Manos Hadjidakis (1925–1994)
     Illya Darling (1967)
 Albert Hague (1920–2001)
     Plain and Fancy (1955)
     Redhead (1959)
     The Girls Against the Boys (1959); music mostly by Richard Lewine
     Café Crown (1964)
     The Fig Leaves Are Falling (1969)
     Dr. Seuss' How the Grinch Stole Christmas! (1998); music also by Mel Marvin
 Herbert Haines (1880–1923)
     The Catch of the Season (1904); music also by Evelyn Baker
     The Talk of the Town (1905); music also by Evelyn Baker
     The Beauty of Bath (1906)
     My Darling (1907); music also by Evelyn Baker
     Pebbles on the Beach (1912)
 Chris Hajian
     Hit the Lights! (1993); additional music by Jon Giluntin
 Carol Hall (1936–2018)
     The Best Little Whorehouse in Texas (1978); also a 1982 film
     The Best Little Whorehouse Goes Public (1994)
     Max and Ruby (2007)
 Kelly Hamilton
     Dance on a Country Grave (1974)
     Trixie True: Teen Detective (1979)
 Morris Hamilton (1897–1955)
     Earl Carroll's Vanities of 1926 (1926)
     Earl Carroll's Vanities of 1928 (1928)
 Marvin Hamlisch (1944–2012)
     A Chorus Line (1975); also a 1985 film
     They're Playing Our Song (1978)
     Jean Seberg (1983)
     Smile (1986)
     The Goodbye Girl (1993)
     Hundreds of Hats (1995); music also by Alan Menken, Jonathan Sheffer
     Sweet Smell of Success (2002)
 Will Hammond
     The Seven (2006); music by Will Power, Justin Ellington
 Neal Hampton
     Sense & Sensibility (2013)
 James F. Hanley (1892–1942)
     Robinson Crusoe, Jr. (1916); music also by Sigmund Romberg
     Jim Jam Jems (1920)
     Pins and Needles of 1922 (1922); music also by Frederick Chappelle
     Spice of 1922 (1922)
     Big Boy (1925); music also by Joseph Meyer
     Honeymoon Lane (1926)
     Sidewalks of New York (1927)
     Keep It Clean (1929); music also by others
     Thumbs Up! (1934); music also by Henry Sullivan
 Glen Hansard (b. 1970)
     Once (2011); music also by Markéta Irglová; also a 2006 film
 John Hanson (1922–1998)
     Smilin' Through (1972)
 Ronan Hardiman (b. 1961)
     Lord of the Dance (1996)
 Alex HardingOnly Heaven Knows (1995)
 Cheryl Hardwick (b. 1944)
     Girls, Girls, Girls (1980)
 Mark Hardwick
     Pump Boys and Dinettes (1981); music also by others
     Oil City Symphony (1986); music also by Mike Craver, Debra Monk, Mary Murfitt
     Radio Gals (1995); music also by Mike Craver
 Edward W. Hardy (b. 1992)
     The Woodsman (2012)
 Edward Harrigan (1844–1911)
     Harrigan 'n Hart (1985); music also by Max Showalter, David Braham
 Ann Harris
     Sky High (1979); incidental music by Frederic Harris
 Frederic Harris
     Sky High (1979); music also by Ann Harris
 Deborah Harry (b. 1945)
     Desperately Seeking Susan (2007)
 Joseph Hart (1858–1921)
     The Idea (1892)
 Larry Hart
     Sisterella (1996)
 Cherly Harwick
     Cut the Ribbons (1992); music also by Mildred Hayden
 James Hatch (b. 1928)
     Fly Blackbird (1962); music also by C. Bernard Jackson
 Tony Hatch (b. 1939)
     The Card (1973)
     Rock Nativity (1976)
 Elmer Hawkes
     The Hunchback of Notre Dame (1996)
 John Hawkins
     Canterbury Tales (1964); music also by Richard Hill
 Mildred Hayden
     Cut the Ribbons (1992); music also by Cherly Harwick
 The Heather Brothers
     Big Sin City (1978)
     A Slice of Saturday Night (1989)
     Lust (1993)
 David Hein (b. 1976)
     Come from Away (2013); music also by Irene Sankoff
 Michael Heitzman
     Bingo (2005); music also by Ilene Reid, David Holcenberg
 Charles E. Henderson (1907–1970)
     Blackouts of 1949 (1949); music also by Royal Foster
 Luther Henderson (1919–2003)
     Doctor Jazz (1975); music also by Buster Davis
     Jelly's Last Jam (1992); music also by Jelly Roll Morton
 Ray Henderson (1896–1970)
     George White's Scandals of 1925 (1925)
     George White's Scandals of 1926 (1926)
     Good News! (1927)
     Manhattan Mary (1927)
     George White's Scandals of 1928 (1928); music also by others
     Hold Everything! (1928)
     Three Cheers (1928); music also by John Raymond Hubbell, Leslie Sarony
     Follow Thru (1929); also a 1930 film
     George White's Scandals of 1929 (1929); music also by Cliff Friend, George White
     Flying High (1930)
     George White's Scandals of 1931 (1931)
     Hot-Cha! (1932)
     Strike Me Pink (1933)
     Say When (1934)
     George White's Scandals of 1936 (1935); music also by others
     Transatlantic Rhythm (1936)
     Ziegfeld Follies of 1943 (1943); music also by Dan White
 Nona Hendryx (b. 1944)
     Blue (2001)
 David Heneker (1906–2001)
     Expresso Bongo (1958); music also by Monty Norman
     Make Me an Offer (1959); music also by Monty Norman
     The Art of Living (1960); music also by Monty Norman
     Half a Sixpence (1963)
     Charlie Girl (1965); music also by John Taylor
     Jorrocks (1966)
     Phil the Fluter (1969)
     Popkiss (1972)
     The Biograph Girl (1980); music also by John Taylor
     Peg (1984)
     Half a Sixpence (2016 revised musical); music also by George Stiles and Anthony Drewe 
 Chad Henry (b. 1946)
     Angry Housewives (1986)
     Pinocchio (1996)
     The Magic Mrs. Piggle Wiggle (2004)
 Victor Herbert (1859–1924)
     Prince Ananias (1894)
     The Wizard of the Nile (1895)
     The Gold Bug (1896)
     The Serenade (1897)
     The Idol's Eye (1897)
     The Fortune Teller (1898)
     Cyrano De Bergerac (1899)
     The Singing Girl (1899)
     The Ameer (1899)
     The Victory (1900)
     Babes in Toyland (1903)
     Babette (1903)
     It Happened in Nordland (1904)
     Miss Dolly Dollars (1905)
     Wonderland (1905)
     Mlle. Modiste (1905)
     The Red Mill (1906)
     Dream City (1906)
     The Magic Knight (1906)
     The Tattooed Man (1907)
     Algeria (1908)
     Little Nemo (1908)
     The Prima Donna (1908)
     The Rose of Algeria (1909)
     Old Dutch (1909)
     Naughty Marietta (1910)
     When Sweet Sixteen (1911)
     The Duchess (1911)
     The Enchantress (1911)
     The Lady and the Slipper (1912)
     Sweethearts (1913)
     The Madcap Duchess (1913)
     The Only Girl (1914)
     The Débutante (1914)
     The Princess Pat (1915)
     The Century Girl (1916); music also by Irving Berlin
     Eileen (1917)
     Miss 1917 (1917); music also by Jerome Kern
     Her Regiment (1917)
     The Velvet Lady (1919)
     Angel Face (1919)
     My Golden Girl (1920)
     Sally (1920); music also by Jerome Kern
     The Girl in the Spotlight (1920)
     Ziegfeld Follies of 1921 (1921); music also by Rudolf Friml and others
     Orange Blossoms (1922)
     Ziegfeld Follies of 1923 (1923); music also by others
     The Dream Girl (1924)
     Gypsy Lady (1946); music adapted by Robert Wright, George Forrest
 Jerry Herman (1931–2019)
     I Feel Wonderful (1954)
     Nightcap (1958)
     From A to Z (1960); music also by others
     Parade (1960)
     Milk and Honey (1961)
     Madame Aphrodite (1961)
     Ben Franklin in Paris (1964); music also by Mark Sandrich, Jr.
     Hello, Dolly! (1964)
     Mame (1966)
     Dear World (1969)
     Mack & Mabel (1974)
     A Day in Hollywood / A Night in the Ukraine (1979); music also by Frank Lazarus, Trevor Lyttleton and others
     The Grand Tour (1979)
     La Cage Aux Folles (1983)
     Jerry's Girls (1984)
     Mrs. Santa Claus (film) (1996)
     An Evening with Jerry Herman (1998)
     Miss Spectacular (2002)
     Showtune (2003)
 Keith Herrmann (b. 1952)
     Onward Victoria (1980)
     Romance/Romance (1987)
     Prom Queens Unchained (1991)
 Jack Herrick
     Lone Star Love (2004)
 Nigel Hess (b. 1953)
     The Swan Down Gloves (1981)
 Hal Hester (1933–1992)
     Your Own Thing (1968); music also by Danny Apolinar
 Mike Hickey
     The Piemaker (2008)
 Joel Higgins (b. 1943)
     Johnny Guitar (2004); music also by Martin Silvestri
 J. Leubrie Hill (1873–1916)
     The Passing Show of 1915 (1915); music also by Leo Edwards, William Frederick Peters
 Richard Hill (b. 1942)
     Canterbury Tales (1964); music also by John Hawkins
 Ulrich Hinterberg
     Pascal – Ein Musikalisches Märchen, music also by Marcus Manske
 Robert Hipkins
     Song of Singapore (1991); music also by Erik Frandsen, Michael Garin, Paula Lockheart
 Louis A. Hirsch (1887–1924)
     He Came from Milwaukee (1910); music also by Ben Jerome
     He Came from New York (1911)
     The Revue of Revues (1911)
     Vera Violetta (1911); music also by Edmund Eysler, George M. Cohan, Jean Schwartz
     The Whirl of Society (1912)
     The Passing Show of 1912 (1912)
     Hullo, Ragtime! (1912)
     Hullo, Tango! (1913)
     Honeymoon Express (1914)
     Dora's Doze (1914)
     Ziegfeld Follies of 1915 (1915)
     Ziegfeld Follies of 1916 (1916); music also by Jerome Kern, Dave Stamper
     The Grass Widow (1917)
     Going Up (1917)
     The Rainbow Girl (1918)
     Ziegfeld Follies of 1918 (1918)
     Oh, My Dear! (1918)
     See-Saw (1919)
     Mary (1920)
     The O'Brian Girl (1921)
     The Greenwich Village Follies (1922)
     Ziegfeld Follies of 1922 (1922); music also by Dave Stamper
     The Greenwich Village Follies (1923)
     Betty Lee (1924); music also by Con Conrad
 Joel Hirschhorn (1938–2005)
     Copperfield (1981); music also by Al Kasha
     Seven Brides for Seven Brothers (1982); music also by Gene de Paul, Al Kasha; also a 1954 film
 Naomi Caryl Hirshorn
     Spoon River Anthology (1963)
 Jeff Hochhauser
     Anne & Gilbert (2005); music also by Nancy White, Bob Johnston
 Larry Hochman (b. 1953)
     One Man Band (1985)
     Phantom of the Opera (1990)
     Newport Newport Max Hoffman (1873–1963)
     A Parisian Model (1906)
 Stephen Hoffman
     Splendora (1995)
 Cary Hoffmann
     What's a Nice Country Like You Doing in a State Like This? (1972)
 David Holcenberg
     Bingo (2005); music also by Michael Heitzman, Ilene Reid
 Ray Holder (b. 1925)
     Troubador (1978)
 Lee Holdridge (b. 1944)
     Into the Light (1986)
 Mark Hollmann (b. 1963)
     Urinetown (1999)
 Laurie Holloway (b. 1938)
     Instant Marriage (1964)
 Roger Holman
     Smike (1973); music also by Simon May
 A.J. Holmes (b. 1988)
     A Very Potter Musical (2009); music also by Darren Criss
     Me and My Dick (2009); music also by Darren Criss, Carlos Valdes
     A Very Potter Senior Year (2012); music also by Clark Baxtresser, Darren Criss, Pierce Siebers
     Twisted: The Untold Story of a Royal Vizier (2013)
 Jack Holmes
     From A to Z (1960); music also by others
     O Say Can You See! (1962)
     Buy Bonds, Buster! (1972)
 Rupert Holmes (b. 1947)
     The Mystery of Edwin Drood (1985)
 Larry Holofcener (1926–2017)
     Mr. Wonderful (1956); music also by Jerry Bock, George David Weiss
 Janet Hood
     Elegies for Angels, Punks and Raging Queens (1989)
 Antony Hopkins (1921–2014)
     Johnny the Priest (1960)
 Lance Horne
     Back in the Day (2007)
 Bruce Hornsby (b. 1954)
     SCKBSTD (2011)
 Jimmy Horowitz
     Marlowe (1981)
 Karl Hoschna (1877–1911)
     Belle of the West (1905)
     The Daughter of the Desert (1905)
     The Girl from Broadway (1907)
     Prince Humbug (1908)
     Three Twins (1908)
     The Silver Star (1909)
     Bright Eyes (1910)
     Katy Did (1910)
     Madame Sherry (1910)
     Jumping Jupiter (1911)
     Dr. Deluxe (1911)
     The Girl of My Dreams (1911)
     The Fascinating Widow (1911)
     The Wall Street Girl (1912)
 Joseph E. Howard (1867–1961)
     The District Leader (1906)
     The Time, the Place and the Girl (1907)
     The Land of Nod and The Song Birds (1907)
     The Flower of the Ranch (1908)
     The Girl Question (1908)
     Stubborn Cinderella (1909)
 Ken Howard (b. 1939)
     Mardi Gras (1976); music also by Alan Blaikley
 George Howe
     Queen Lucia (2005)
 Jason Howland (b.1971)
     Little Women (2004)
 John Raymond Hubbell (1879–1954)
     Three Cheers (1928); music also by Ray Henderson, Leslie Sarony
 Adrian Huge
     Shockheaded Peter (1998); music also by Martyn Jacques, Adrian Stout
 Gwyn Hughes
     Bernadette (1990); music also by Maureen Hughes
 Maureen Hughes
     Bernadette (1990); music also by Gwyn Hughes
 Franz Hummel (b. 1939)
     Ludwig II: Sehnsucht nach dem Paradies (2000)
 Herman Hupfeld (1894–1951)
     The Third Little Show (1931); music also by others
     Americana (1932); music also by Jay Gorney, Harold Arlen, Richard Meyers
 Lawrence Hurwit
     Sextet (1974)
 Lorne Huycke
     The Wayward Way (1953)

 I 
 Eric Idle (b. 1943)
     Spamalot (2004); music also by John Du Prez
 Damon Intrabartolo (b. 1975)
     Bare (2000)
 Markéta Irglová (b. 1988)
     Once (2011); music also by Glen Hansard; also a 2006 film
 William C. K. "Will" Irwin (1907–1998)
     Portofino (1958); music also by Louie Bellson
     Earl Carroll's Sketch Book 1935 (1935); music also by others
     Hey Nonny Nonny! (1932); music also by others
 Iskanada Ismail
     Snow.Wolf.Lake (1997); music also by Guo Sai Cheung, Dick Lee, Lam Ming Yeung
 Aleksei Ivaschenko (b. 1958)
     Nord-Ost (2001); music also by Georgii Vasilyev

 J 
 Paul Jabara (1948–1992)
     Rachael Lily Rosenbloom (And Don't You Ever Forget It) (1973)
 C. Bernard Jackson (1927–1996)
     Fly Blackbird (1962); music also by James Hatch
 Bill Jacob
     Jimmy (1969); music also by Patti Jacob
 Patti Jacob
     Jimmy (1969); music also by Bill Jacob
 Jim Jacobs (b. 1942)
     Grease (1972); music also by Warren Casey; also a 1978 film
 Paul Jacobs (b. 1950)
     National Lampoon's Lemmings (1973); music also by Christopher Guest
 Harry Jacobson
     Evangeline (1946); music also by George Posford
 Hy Jacobson (1895–1952)
     Bagels and Yox (1951); music also by Sholom Secunda
 John Jacobson
     A Matter of Opinion (1980); music also by Harold Danko
 Kenneth Jacobson (b. 1930)
     Bottoms Up! (1949)
     Hot September (1965)
     Show Me Where the Good Times Are (1970)
 Martyn Jacques (b. 1959)
     Shockheaded Peter (1998); music also by Adrian Huge, Adrian Stout
 Bob James (b. 1939)
     The Selling of the President (1972)
 Byron Janis (b. 1928)
     The Hunchback of Notre Dame (1993)
 Steve Jankowski
     Francis (1981)
 Alaric Jans (b. 1949)
     Do Black Patent Leather Shoes Really Reflect Up? (1982); music also by James Quinn
 Richard Jarboe
     Hamelin: A Musical Tale from Rags to Riches (1985); music also by Harvey Shield
 Kyle Jarrow (b. 1979)
     A Very Merry Unauthorized Children's Scientology Pageant (2003)
     Hostage Song (2008)
 Karen Sokolof Javitch
     Love! At the Cafe! (1996)
     From Generation to Generation (1996)
     Princess Diana, the Musical (1998)
     Surprise! The Musical (2000)
     Rachel and Ruthie (2009)
 Raymond Jeannot
     La Révolution Française (1973); music also by Claude-Michel Schönberg
 Michael Jeffrey
     The Meteoric Rise of Edmund Kean (1997)
     Escape from Pterodactyl Island (1999)
     The Rose and the Ring (2002)
     High Hair and Jalapeños (2008) 
     The Postman and the Poet (2012)
 Gordon Jenkins (1910–1984)
     Along Fifth Avenue (1949)
 John Jennings (1933–1988)
     Riverwind (1962)
 Ben Jerome (1881–1938)
     The Supper Club (1901); music also by others
     The Darling of the Gallery Gods (1903)
     The Dress Parade (1903)
     The Isle of Spice (1904); music also by Paul Schindler
     The Royal Chef (1904)
     The Mimic World 1908 (1908); music also by Seymour Furth
     Mr. Hamlet of Broadway (1908)
     He Came from Milwaukee (1910); music also by Louis A. Hirsch
     Yes, Yes, Yvette (1927); music also by Philip Charig
 Raymond Jessel (1929–2015)
     Baker Street (1965); music also by Jerry Bock, Marian Grudeff
 Jimmy Jewell
     NHS – The Musical (2006); music also by Nick Stimson
 Billy Joel (b. 1949)
     Movin' Out (2002)
 Alan John (b. 1958)
     Jonah Jones (1985)
 Elton John (b. 1947)
     The Lion King (1997); music also by Hans Zimmer, Lebo M, Mark Mancina, Jay Rifkin
     Aida (1998)
     Billy Elliot (2005)
     Lestat (2005)
 Zdeněk John
     Rusalka (1998); musical after Antonín Dvořák's opera Rusalka Laurie Johnson (b. 1927)
     Lock Up Your Daughters (1959)
     Pieces of Eight (1959)
     The Four Musketeers (1967)
 Ben Johnston (1926–2019)
     Carmilla (1972)
 Bob Johnston (b. 1932)
     Theda Barra and the Frontier Rabbi (1993)
     Anne & Gilbert (2005); music also by Jeff Hochhauser, Nancy White
     My Vaudeville Man! (2008)
 Tom Johnstone
     Up in the Clouds (1922)
     Molly Darling (1922)
     Plain Jane (1924)
     I'll Say She Is (1924)
     When You Smile (1925)
 Arthur Jones
     Buttrio Square (1952); music also by Fred Stamer
 Cliff Jones
     Rockabye Hamlet (1976)
 Sidney Jones (1861–1946)
     A Gaiety Girl (1893)
     An Artist's Model (1895)
     The Geisha (1896)
     A Greek Slave (1898); music also by Lionel Monckton
     San Toy (1899); music also by Lionel Monckton
     My Lady Molly (1902)
     The Medal and the Maid (1903)
     See-See (1906)
     King of Cadonia (1908); music also by Jerome Kern
     A Persian Princess (1909)
     The Girl from Utah (1914); music also by Paul Rubens, Jerome Kern and others
     The Happy Day (1916); music also by Paul Rubens
 Stephen Jones (1880–1967)
     Poppy (1923); music also by Arthur Samuels
     Marjorie (1924); music also by Sigmund Romberg, Herbert Stothart, Philip Culkin
     Captain Jinks (1925); music also by Lewis E. Gensler
 Scott Joplin (c.1867–1917)
     The Tin Pan Alley Rag (2009); music also by Irving Berlin
 Louis Jordan (1908–1975)
     Five Guys Named Moe (1990); music also by others
 Udo Jürgens (1934–2011)
     Helden, Helden (1972)
     Ich war noch niemals in New York (2007)
 Jimmy Justice
     Sancocho (1979); music also by Ramiro Ramirez

 K 
 Gabriel Kahane (b. 1981)
     February House (2012)
 Roger Wolfe Kahn (1907–1962)
     Here's Howe (1928); music also by Joseph Meyer
     Americana (1928)
 Nanne Kalma
     ...van't Schip Batavia (1995)
 Emmerich Kálmán (1882–1953)
     Her Soldier Boy (1916); music also by Sigmund Romberg
     The Yankee Princess (1922)
     Countess Maritza (1926)
     Golden Dawn (1927); music also by Herbert Stothart
     Marinka (1945)
 John Kander (b. 1927)
     A Family Affair (1962)
     Flora the Red Menace (1965)
     Cabaret (1966); also a 1972 film
     The Happy Time (1968)
     Zorbá (1968)
     70, Girls, 70 (1971)
     Chicago (1975); also a 2002 film
     The Act (1977)
     Woman of the Year (1981)
     The Rink (1984)
     And the World Goes 'Round (1991)
     Kiss of the Spider Woman (1992)
     Steel Pier (1997)
     All About Us (1999)
     The Visit (2001)
     Curtains (2006)
     The Scottsboro Boys (2010)
 Bronisław Kaper (1902–1983)
     Polonaise (1945)
 Robert Kapilow (b. 1952)
     Green Eggs and Ham (1995)
 Jon and Al Kaplan (b. 1976 and 1978)
     Silence! (2005)
     24: Season Two (2008)
 Richard Kapp (1936–2006)
     Teddy & Alice (1987); music also by John Philip Sousa
 Harold Karr (1921–1968)
     Happy Hunting (1956)
 Al Kasha (1937–2020)
     Copperfield (1981); music also by Joel Hirschhorn
     Seven Brides for Seven Brothers (1982); music also by Gene de Paul, Joel Hirschhorn; also a 1954 film
 Hereward Kaye
     Moby Dick (1992)
 Barry Keating
     Starmites (1987)
 Keb' Mo' (b. 1951)
     Thunder Knocking at the Door (2002); music also by Anderson Edwards
 Stephen Keeling (b. 1966)
     Maddie (1997)
     La Cava (2000); music also by Laurence O'Keefe
     Heidi (2005)
     Heidi and Johanna (2007)
     My Father's Son Eliot Kennedy
     Finding Neverland (2012); music also by Gary Barlow
 Skip Kennon
     Herringbone (1982)
     The Last Starfighter (2004)
 Walter Kent (1911–1994)
     Seventeen (1951)
 Gustave Kerker (1857–1923)
     The Belle of New York (1897)
     The Man in the Moon (1899); music also by Ludwig Engländer, Reginald Dekoven
 Jerome Kern (1885–1945)
     Mr. Wix of Wickham (1904); 1902 West End version with music by Herbert Darnley, George Everard
     Fascinating Flora (1907); music mostly by others
     The Dairymaids (1907); music mostly by others
     Fluffy Ruffles (1908); music mostly by others
     King of Cadonia (1908); music also by Sidney Jones
     La Belle Paree (1911); music also by Frank E. Tours
     The Kiss Waltz (1911); music mostly by others
     The Girl from Montmartre (1912); music also by Henri Bereny
     The Red Petticoat (1912)
     The Doll Girl (1913); music mostly by Leo Fall
     Oh, I Say! (1913)
     The Laughing Husband (1914); music mostly by Edmund Eysler, Wimperis
     The Girl from Utah (1914); music also by Paul Rubens, Sidney Jones and others
     90 in the Shade (1915)
     Nobody Home (1915)
     Miss Information (1915)
     Very Good Eddie (1915)
     Ziegfeld Follies of 1916 (1916); music also by Dave Stamper, Louis Hirsch
     Have a Heart (1917)
     Love o' Mike (1917)
     Theodore & Co (1917); music also by Ivor Novello
     Oh, Boy! (1917); renamed Oh, Joy! for the London production (1919)
     Leave It to Jane (1917)
     Miss 1917 (1917); music also by Victor Herbert
     Oh, Lady! Lady!! (1918)
     Toot-Toot! (1918)
     Rock-A-Bye Baby (1918)
     Head Over Heels (1918)
     She's a Good Fellow (1919)
     The Night Boat (1920)
     Hitchy-Koo of 1920 (1920)
     Sally (1920); music also by Victor Herbert
     Good Morning Dearie (1921)
     The Bunch and Judy (1922)
     The Cabaret Girl (1922)
     Stepping Stones (1923)
     Sitting Pretty (1924)
     Dear Sir (1924)
     Sunny (1925)
     The City Chap (1925)
     Criss-Cross (1926)
     Lucky (1927); music mostly by Harry Ruby
     Show Boat (1927); also 3 film versions (1929, 1936, 1951)
     Sweet Adeline (1929)
     The Cat and the Fiddle (1931)
     Music in the Air (1932)
     Roberta (1933)
     Very Warm for May (1939)
     Jerome Kern Goes to Hollywood (1985)
     Never Gonna Dance (2003)
 Lee Kernaghan (b. 1964)
     The Man from Snowy River (2002); music also by Bruce Rowland, Garth Porter
 Robert Kessler
     O Marry Me! (1961)
 Bert Keyes (1930–1987)
     But Never Jam Today (1979); music also by Bob Larimer
 Ayub Khan-Din (b. 1961)
     Bunty Berman Presents... (2013); music also by Paul Bogaev
 Anthony King
     Pull Both Ends (1972); music also by John Schroeder
 Anthony King (b. 1975)
     Gutenberg! The Musical! (2005); music also by Scott Brown
 Carole King (b. 1942)
     Really Rosie (1975)
 Denis King (b. 1939)
     Privates on Parade (1977)
     Worzel Gummidge (1981)
     Bashville (1983)
     Stepping Out (1997)
     A Saint She Ain't (1999)
     Awaking Beauty (2008)
 Scott Kingman
     Gulp! (1976)
 Joe Kinosian
     Murder for Two (2011)
 Wayne Kirkpatrick
     Something Rotten! (2015)
 David Kirshenbaum
     Summer of '42 (2001)
     Party Come Here (2005)
     Vanities (2005)
 Tom Kitt (b. 1974)
     High Fidelity (2006)
     From Up Here (2008)
     Next to Normal (2008)
     Bring It On (2011); music also by Lin-Manuel Miranda
     If/Then (2013)
     Freaky Friday (2016)
     Dave (2018)
 Edward Kleban (1939–1987)
     A Class Act (2000)
 Manuel Klein (1876–1919)
     Mr. Pickwick (1903)
 Paul Klein
     From A to Z (1960); music also by others
     Morning Sun (1963)
 Randy Klein
     It's Wilde! (1980)
 Barry Kleinbort
     Big City Rhythm (1995)
 George Kleinsinger (1914–1982)
     Archy and Mehitabel (1954)
     Shinbone Alley (1957); 2nd version of Archy and Mehitabel Michael Knight
     Exchange (1970); music also by Robert J. Lowery, Mike Brandt
 Brian Knowles (b. 1946)
     Jane Eyre (1993)
     The Government Inspector (2002)
 Leon Ko (b. 1973)
     Heading East (1999)
     The Good Person of Szechwan (2003)
     Perhaps Love (2005)
     The Legend of the White Snake (2006)
     Angel Falls (2007)
     Field of Dreams (2008)
 Ted Kociolek
     Abyssinia (1987)
 Walter Kollo (1878–1940)
     Springtime of Youth (1922); music also by Sigmund Romberg
     Paris (1928); music also by Cole Porter, Harry Warren, Louis Alter, Fred E. Ahlert
 Joseph M. Kookolis
     Soon (1971); music also by Scott Fagan
 David Krane
     Aspire (2005)
     The Road to Qatar! (2011)
 Fritz Kreisler (1875–1962)
     Rhapsody (1944)
 Henry Krieger (b. 1945)
     Dreamgirls (1981); also a 2006 film
     The Tap Dance Kid (1983)
     Side Show (1997)
     Love's Fowl (1998)
     Everything's Ducky (2000)
     Kept (2002)
 Edward Künneke (1885–1953)
     The Love Song (1925)
     Mayflowers (1925)
 Jay Kuo (b. 1968)
     Upwardly Mobile (1989)
     Insignificant Others (2006)
     Worlds Apart (2006)
     Allegiance (2012)
 Gary Kupper
     Freckleface Strawberry (2011)
 Fela Kuti (1938–1997)
     Fela! (2008)

 L 
 Michael John LaChiusa (b. 1962)
     Buzzsaw Berkeley (1989)
     Hello Again (1993)
     First Lady Suite (1993)
     The Petrified Prince (1994)
     Marie Christine (1999)
     The Wild Party (2000)
     Little Fish (2003)
     See What I Wanna See (2005)
     Bernarda Alba (2006)
     Giant (2009)
     Queen of the Mist (2011)
 Ladysmith Black Mambazo
     The Song of Jacob Zulu (1993)
 Marvin Laird
     Ruthless! (1992)
 Lisa Lambert (b. 1962)
     The Drowsy Chaperone (2006); music also by Greg Morrison
 Scott Lamps
     Holy Musical B@man! (2012); music also by Nick Gage
 Daniel Landa (b. 1968)
     Krysař (1996); also a 1985 animated film
 Burton Lane (1912–1997)
     Earl Carroll's Vanities of 1931 (1931); music also by others
     Hold on to Your Hats (1940)
     Laffing Room Only (1944)
     Finian's Rainbow (1947)
     On a Clear Day You Can See Forever (1965); also a 1970 film
     Carmelina (1979)
 Paul Lannin
     Two Little Girls in Blue (1921); music also by Vincent Youmans
     For Goodness Sake (1922); music also by William Daly
     A la Carte (1927); music also by others
 Alain Lanty (b. 1961)
     Les mille et une vies d'Ali Baba (2000); music also by Fabrice Aboulker
 Bob Larimer
     King of the Whole Damn World! (1962)
     But Never Jam Today (1979); music also by Bert Keyes
 Jonathan Larson (1960–1996)
     Rent (1996); also a 2005 film
     tick, tick... BOOM! (2001)
 Peter Larson
     Brownstone (1979)
 Brian Lasser
     A Bundle of Nerves (1983)
 Cyndi Lauper (b. 1953)
     Kinky Boots (2012)
 Jack Lawrence (1912–2009)
     Courtin' Time (1951); music also by Don Walker
     I Had a Ball (1964); music also by Stan Freeman
 Maury Laws (1923–2019)
     A Month of Sundays (1968)
 Roger Lax
     Weekend (1983)
 Frank Lazarus
     A Day in Hollywood / A Night in the Ukraine (1979); music also by Jerry Herman, Trevor Lyttleton, and others
 Mike Leander (1941–1996)
     Matador (1991)
 Stanley Lebowsky (1926–1986)
     Gantry (1970)
 Janek Ledecký (b. 1962)
     Hamlet (2000)
     Galileo (2003)
     Vánoční zázrak aneb Sliby se maj plnit o Vánocích (The Christmas Miracle) (2011)
 David Lee (b. 1926)
     New Cranks (1960)
     Our Man Crichton (1964)
 Dick Lee (b. 1956)
     Beauty World (1994)
     Fried Rice Paradise (1991)
     Nagraland (1992)
     Kampong Amber (1994)
     Sing to the Dawn (1996)
     A Twist of Fate (1997)
     Snow.Wolf.Lake (1997); music also by Guo Sai Cheung, Iskanada Ismail, Lam Ming Yeung
     Phua Chu Kang (2000)
     Forbidden City: Portrait of an Empress (2002)
     Puteri Gunung Ledang (2006)
 Lester Lee (1904–1956)
     New Priorities of 1943 (1942)
     All for Love (1949); music also by Allan Roberts
 Stewart Lee (b. 1968)
     Jerry Springer: The Opera (2003); music also by Richard Thomas
 Michel Legrand (1932–2019)
     Brainchild (1974)
     Les Parapluies de Cherbourg (1979)
     Amour (2002)
     Les Demoiselles de Rochefort (2003)
     Marguerite (2008)
 Franz Lehár (1870–1948)
     The Merry Widow (1905)
 Tom Lehrer (b. 1928)
     Tom Foolery (1980)
 Jerry Leiber (1933–2011)
     Smokey Joe's Cafe (1995); music also by Mike Stoller
 Mitch Leigh (1928–2014)
     Man of La Mancha (1965); also a 1972 film
     Chu Chem (1966)
     Cry for Us All (1970)
     Home Sweet Homer (1976)
     Saravà (1979)
     Ain't Broadway Grand (1993)
 Walter Leigh (1905–1942)
     Victoria Regina (1935)
     Nine Sharp (1938)
     The Little Revue (1939)
 John Lennon (1940–1980)
     Beatlemania (1977); music also by Paul McCartney
     Norwegian Wood (1988); music also by Paul McCartney
     Looking through a Glass Onion (1993)
     Lennon (2005)
 Michael Leonard
     The Yearling (1965)
 Ray Leslee
     Standup Shakespeare (1987)
     Avenue X (1994)
 Kenneth Leslie-Smith (1897–1993)
     Bet Your Life (1952); music also by Charles Zwar
 George Lessner (1904–1997)
     Sleepy Hollow (1948)
 Sonny Lester (b. 1924)
     This Was Burlesque (1965); music also by Bill Grundy
 Sylvester Levay (b. 1945)
     Elizabeth (1992)
     Mozart! (1999)
     Rebecca (2006)
     Marie Antoinette (2006)
 Daniel Levine
     Anna Karenina (1992)
 Ilya Levinson
     If I Embarrass You, Tell Your Friends (2008)
 David Levy
     Hey Ma...Kaye Ballard (1984); music also by Leslie Eberhard
     The Wonder Years (1988)
 Shuki Levy (b. 1947)
     Imagine This (2007)
 Gene Lewin
     Striking 12 (2006); music also by Brendan Milburn, Valerie Vigoda
 Richard Lewine (1910–2005)
     Make Mine Manhattan (1948)
     The Girls Against the Boys (1959); music also by Albert Hague
 Henry Lewis
     Joan of Kent (1989)
     Please Sir, How Do I Write a Hit Musical? (1992)
 Michael J. Lewis (b. 1939)
     Cyrano (1973)
     Voyeurz (1996); music also by Peter Rafelson
 Morgan Lewis (1906–1968)
     New Faces of 1934 (1934); music also by others
     One For the Money (1939)
     Two for the Show (1940)
     Three to Make Ready (1946)
 Conor Linehan
     Little Wolf's Book of Badness (2007)
 Peter Link (b. 1944)
     Salvation (1969); music also by C.C. Courtney
     Earl of Ruston (1971)
     King of Hearts (1978)
     The River (1988)
     Sundown (2002)
 Andrew Lippa (b. 1964)
     john & jen (1995)
     The Wild Party (2000)
     A Little Princess (2004)
     The Addams Family (2009)
     Big Fish (2013)
 Sidney Lippman (1914–2003)
     Barefoot Boy with Cheek (1947)
 Jay Livingston (1915–2001)
     Aaron Slick from Punkin Crick (1952); music also by Ray Evans
     Oh, Captain! (1958); music also by Ray Evans
     Let It Ride (1961); music also by Ray Evans
 Jerry Livingston (1909–1987)
     Bright Lights of 1944 (1943)
     Jack and the Beanstalk (1956)
     Molly (1973)
 Andrew Lloyd Webber (b. 1948)
     The Likes of Us (1965)
     Jesus Christ Superstar (1971)
     Joseph and the Amazing Technicolor Dreamcoat (1972)
     By Jeeves (1975)
     Evita (1978)
     Tell Me on a Sunday (1979)
     Cats (1981)
     Song and Dance (1982)
     Starlight Express (1984)
     Phantom of the Opera (1986)
     Aspects of Love (1989)
     Sunset Boulevard (1992)
     Whistle Down the Wind (1996)
     The Beautiful Game (2000)
     The Woman in White (2004)
     Love Never Dies (2010)
     The Wizard of Oz (2011); music also by Harold Arlen
     Stephen Ward (2013)
     School of Rock (2015)
     Cinderella (2021)
 Paula Lockheart
     Song of Singapore (1991); music also by Erik Frandsen, Michael Garin, Robert Hipkins
 John Jacob Loeb (1910–1970)
     Arabian Nights (1954); music also by Carmen Lombardo
 Frank Loesser (1910–1969)
     The Illustrators' Show (1936)
     Where's Charley? (1948)
     Guys and Dolls (1950); also a 1955 film
     The Most Happy Fella (1956)
     Greenwillow (1960)
     How to Succeed in Business Without Really Trying (1961); also a 1967 film
     Pleasures and Palaces (1965)
     Perfectly Frank (1980); music also by others
 Frederick Loewe (1901–1988)
     Great Lady (1938)
     Life of the Party (1942)
     What's Up? (1943)
     The Day Before Spring (1945)
     Brigadoon (1947); also a 1954 film
     Paint Your Wagon (1951); also a 1969 film
     My Fair Lady (1956); also a 1964 film
     Camelot (1960); also a 1967 film
     Gigi (1973); also a 1958 film
     The Little Prince (1974 film)
 Carmen Lombardo (1903–1971)
     Arabian Nights (1954); music also by John Jacob Loeb
 Kenn Long
     Touch (1970); music also by Jim Crozier
 Robert Lopez (b. 1975)
     Avenue Q (2003); music also by Jeff Marx
     The Book of Mormon (2011); music also by Trey Parker and Matt Stone
 Brent Lord
     Go-Go Beach (2006); music also by Michael Shaieb
 Graham Losee
     Giant Killer Shark: The Musical (2006); music also by Sam Sutherland, Aaron Zorgel
 Natalie Lovejoy
     Deployed (2013)
 Alex Loveless
     The Remains of the Day (2010)
 Ken Low
     Chang & Eng (1997)
 Chris Lowe (b. 1959) (member of Pet Shop Boys)
     Closer to Heaven (2001); music also by Neil Tennant
 Robert J. Lowery
     Exchange (1970); music also by Michael Knight, Mike Brandt
 Harry Lubin (1906–1977)
     The Singing Rabbi (1931); music also by Joseph Rumshinsky
 Jeffery Lunden
     Wings (1992)
 Steven Lutvak (b. 1959)
     A Gentleman's Guide to Love and Murder (2012)
 Kevin Lynch
     Rush! (1998)
 Phyllis Lynd
     I Love You, Madam President (1994)
 Jeff Lynne (b. 1947)
     Xanadu (2007); music also by John Farrar
 Ron Lytle
     Oh My Godmother! (2005)
     The Man Who Saved Christmas (2006)
 Trevor Lyttleton
     A Day in Hollywood / A Night in the Ukraine'' (1979); music also by Frank Lazarus, Jerry Herman, and others

See also
 List of musical theatre composers
 Lists of musicals

References
 Internet Broadway Database
 Internet Off Broadway Database
 London Theatre Database
 Cast Album Database
 The Guide to the Musical Theatre

Notes

 
 
composer